This is a list of main and recurring fictional characters from The Venture Bros., a comic science fiction television series broadcast on Adult Swim.

Overview

Team Venture
Team Venture comprises the central characters in the show; they formerly lived in a fortified compound in Colorado Springs that doubled as the headquarters for the company, "Venture Industries". After the compound was destroyed in Season Six, and Dr. Venture inherits his brother's fortune, they relocate to the Ventech Tower, located at Columbus Circle in Manhattan.

Dr. Rusty Venture
Dr. Thaddeus "Rusty" Venture (voiced by James Urbaniak): Dean and Hank's father, head of Venture Industries, and half-brother of The Monarch. He is a capable scientist and inventor, but his greed, lack of formal education, and insistence on cutting corners result in his attempts at technological innovation failing, resulting in chaos for him, his family, friends, and sometimes the world at large. Although the money he earns is enough to support him and his family, it's also not enough to satisfy his greed and his ambitions to be as wealthy and successful as his father. While he cares for his sons, his father's abusive and negligent parenting influences the way he treats them, sometimes being as callous and indifferent to them as his father was to him.

Brock Samson
Brock Fitzgerald Samson (voiced by Patrick Warburton): A one-half Swedish, one-quarter Polish, one-quarter Winnebago "murder machine" who acts as a bodyguard to the Venture family and attended the same university as Dr. Venture. Although Brock possesses a license to kill, he refuses to use a gun and instead wields a Ka-Bar fighting knife as his signature weapon. He has shown signs of being somewhat conflicted with his place in the world and unsure about his purpose, and has a personal code of ethics regarding innocents and whom he will kill if they are a threat to him and or the Ventures. He owns an orange 1969 Dodge Hemi Charger named "Adrianne", which he is often seen driving or washing shirtless at the Venture compound.

Hank Venture
Henry Allen "Hank" Venture (voiced by Christopher McCulloch): A teenage boy, one half of the eponymous pair, the older fraternal twin with blond hair. He is shown as the more outgoing and daring of the pair, and is more attracted to action and adventure, seeing himself as a vigilante superhero. In season 4, he became even more rebellious when Brock left, even going so far as to lose his virginity to an older woman who turns out to be the mother of his best friend. After briefly joining the former Henchman 21's version of S.P.H.I.N.X., Hank attained
the power suit of former S.P.H.I.N.X. member The Countess, which he wore until it was stolen and destroyed, leaving Hank in physical therapy for some time due to his atrophied muscles. In season 6, Hank decides to forgo college and gets a job at a pizzeria as a delivery boy. He also begins a relationship with Sirena Ong, the daughter of his father's current Guild-assigned villain, Wide Wale. In season 7, he falls into a coma after he discovers Sirena cheating on him with Dean, but recovers.

Dean Venture
Dean Venture (voiced by Michael Sinterniklaas): A teenage boy, one half of the eponymous pair, the younger fraternal twin with red hair. While more timid than Hank, he shows signs of being more emotionally mature than his brother. Dean is more favored and liked than Hank by their father who grooms Dean to succeed him as the heir to Venture Industries. Like his brother, Dean has been killed over a dozen times, but each time he is replaced with an exact clone who has no memory of the death. After being dumped by Triana and discovering he is a clone, Dean became more of an emo, dressing in a black "speedsuit", moving out of his childhood bedroom, and becoming more unwilling to go with his family on adventures. However, Hank snaps him out of it by showing optimism and being a part of their family. In season 6, Dean begins attending the fictional Stuyvestant University in New York, where he thrives as a student of philosophy, and finds a friend with Brown Widow, his roommate. In season 7, he has an affair with Hank's girlfriend, Sirena Ong, but regrets doing so.

H.E.L.P.eR.
H.E.L.P.eR. (voiced by Christopher McCulloch; credited as "Soul-Bot"): An acronym for Humanoid Electronic Lab Partner Robot.  The Venture family's personal helper robot, who communicates via electronic beeps. Though he is very sensitive, the Ventures often treat him like an old appliance or pet. The robot routinely gets smashed to pieces during the course of their adventures but seems to get repaired by the next show.

Sergeant Hatred
Sergeant Hatred AKA Courtney Robert Haine (voiced by Brendon Small in season 2 and Christopher McCulloch from season 3 onward): Brock's former supervisor in the O.S.I., husband of Native American villainess Princess Tinyfeet, and the Venture family's bodyguard. He is a large muscular man with a giant red 'H' tattooed on his face and wears military fatigues. Despite being a convicted child molester for having slept with a 17-year-old, he is liked and respected throughout the supervillain community for his unfailing politeness and generosity; certain episodes also reveal that he knows his sexual attraction to teenagers is wrong, and tries to keep it in check using medication and electroshock therapy.He is known for his caring nature behind his battle-hardened exterior.

Dermott Fictel
Dermott Fictel (voiced by Doc Hammer): An obnoxious teenager who first appears in "The Buddy System"; he was hinted to be the son of Brock Samson. Dermott is a compulsive liar and frequently interjects wild, and often clearly false claims about his abilities and past deeds into unrelated conversations. He is Hank's best friend and occasionally visits the Venture compound from the nearby trailer park where he and his "mother" live. In "Everybody Comes to Hank's" Hank sleeps with Nikki Fictel (voiced by Kate McKinnon) whom Dermott knows as his older sister, but is actually his mother. His real father is also revealed to be Rusty, making him Hank and Dean's half-brother. He stays behind when the Venture family moves to New York and later joins the OSI, being accepted as an operative despite his lack of training thanks to a good word put in for him by Dr. Venture.

Venture acquaintances

Dr. Jonas Venture Jr.
Dr. Jonas Venture Jr., also known as J.J. (voiced by James Urbaniak): Dr. Venture's deformed twin, who was absorbed by Rusty in the womb and surgically freed from Rusty's body after being mistaken for a tumor. Although he has the body of an infant, he has an adult appearance and seems to have inherited his father's brilliance. He is scientifically astute, hard-working, attractive to women, and a multi-billionaire CEO of a profitable corporation. However, his worship of his father causes the original Team Venture to greatly dislike him, as he ignores their importance to his father's life, business, and legacy. JJ dies in "All This and Gargantua-2" when he sacrifices himself to prevent his space station, Gargantua-2, from harming people, when it self-destructs due to sabotage from The Investors. In his will and testament, he bequeaths his fortune, the New York City Headquarters, and technology patents to his brother.

Triana Orpheus
Triana Orpheus (voiced by Lisa Hammer): Dr. Orpheus's 17-year-old quasi-goth daughter. She has purple hair and is fairly friendly with the Venture twins. She and Dean become close until they have a major fight and falling out after she chooses to date another boy called Raven over Dean. In season four it is revealed that she has inherited her father's abilities when she encounters her father's mystical mentor who purposely took up residence in her closet as a result of her power.

Pete White
Pete White (voiced by Christopher McCulloch): An albino computer scientist and co-founder of Conjectural Technologies. He went to college with Venture, Samson, Baron Ünderbheit, and The Monarch where he hosted a new wave radio show called "The White Room". After graduating with a doctorate in computer science, White and Billy Quizboy worked in tandem on a Jeopardy-style game show, called "QuizBoys" in which Pete hosted and Billy participated. After being caught cheating and rigging the shows in their favor, White and Quizboy were fired and left to find new lives. While the two had a short falling out, Pete eventually rejoined Billy. They found refuge in a trailer near the Venture Compound. Like Venture and Quizboy, White tends to be somewhat lazy and half-hearted in his efforts despite him being very well skilled and knowledgeable in superscience and technology. In Season Six after Dr. Venture inherits his brother's company and fortune, he and Billy move to New York City with the Venture family and become one of Dr. Venture's leading scientists, helping him invent breakthrough technology to sell through Ventech.

Billy Quizboy
William Whalen, a.k.a. Master Billy Quizboy (voiced by Doc Hammer): A self-proclaimed "boy genius," Billy Whalen is actually an adult with a speech impediment and growth hormone deficiency. He suffers from hydrocephalus, although his intellect seems to be unaffected by this condition. He starred as a contestant on the game show Quizboys hosted by Pete White. When White cheated for him, they were both kicked off the show and Billy's winnings were frozen by the SEC. White and Billy approached Dr. Venture looking to work for him but Rusty turned them both away. After this, White accidentally entered Billy into a dog fight, thinking it was an underground quiz match, Billy lost a hand and eye in the mix-up. Billy left White and was recruited by Brock Samson and Hunter Gathers, who provided him with a mechanical hand and camera eye. Brock and Hunter sent Billy undercover to spy on Professor Hamilton Fantomas and dig up dirt on the possible existence of the Guild of Calamitous Intent. Fantomas had Billy help with his experiment, but the experiment went wrong, Fantomas became Phantom Limb and Billy lost his left eye again. After a mind wipe, Brock smuggled Billy out of O.S.I. and left him with White. Despite not having a formal education and training, he became a medical doctor and neurogeneticist and co-founder of Conjectural Technologies. He also briefly joined the Order of the Triad in exchange for his performing brain surgery on the Outrider after claiming he should be paid for his endeavor. In season 5, Billy's old nemesis Augustus St. Cloud became his and White's designated arch-enemy, much to the duo's delight. In Season 6, he and Peter move with The Venture family to New York City to assist Dr. Venture with inventing breakthrough technology to sell under the Ventech brand.

The Pirate Captain
The Pirate Captain (voiced by Christopher McCulloch): The leader of the "ghost pirates" in "Ghosts of the Sargasso". After his initial encounter with the Venture family, he began living on the X-2 after having difficulties in finding a job. When Jonas Jr. acquired the ship, he hired the captain. He has not been referred to by any name or nickname other than "The Captain" so far. He resided with Jonas Jr. on Spider Skull Island and fulfilled the duties of a butler, caretaker, and right-hand man. The Captain always refers to Jonas as "Chairman". Later, after J.J.'s death, the Captain becomes an employee of Dr. Venture when he inherits J.J.'s business in New York City.

The Order of the Triad

Dr. Byron Orpheus
Dr. Byron Orpheus (voiced by Steven Rattazzi): A necromancer who rents a portion of the Venture Compound and is friendly with Dr. Venture. Along with Brock, he is the only associate of Dr. Venture who displays any sort of competence and morals, although his pomposity tends to detract from his abilities. His speech is filled with overly dramatic phrases, delivered in a theatrically grandiose voice with emphasis on mundane topics, usually over a background of ominous trumpet-laden music. After witnessing Dr. Venture's various enemies, he develops a fervent desire for a nemesis of his own and is later given the opportunity when the Guild approves his request for one in the season 2 episode "Fallen Arches", holding a series of interviews for the position. He is fiercely protective of Hank and Dean Venture, after being responsible for their "death" at the end of Season 1, only to find out the truth about the boys in Season 2. He is the father of Triana Orpheus who lived with him on the Venture Compound until she moved in with Orpheus's ex-wife after she broke up with Dean Venture. By season 7, it appears that he and the Order of the Triad move to New York City in order to be closer to The Ventures.

Jefferson Twilight
Jefferson Twilight (voiced by Charles Parnell): An old dhampir friend of Dr. Orpheus, who fights Blaculas (black vampires) for a living and wields two swords. He suffers from diabetes and low blood sugar, leading him to thirst for sugared liquids. His left eye is discolored as it is a magical blacula tracker he calls the "Blood Eye." The episode "What Goes Down Must Come Up" reveals much of his backstory, including that his mother was taken by marauding Blaculas when he was ten and he was a tank commander in the USMC.

The Alchemist
The Alchemist (voiced by Dana Snyder): Another old friend of Dr. Orpheus, who is searching for the philosopher's stone as well as a cure for AIDS. Unlike Twilight and Orpheus, it would seem that he is much less serious about his business and would rather mix business with pleasure; however, his true opinion on the Triad was revealed in the episode "Showdown at Cremation Creek", where he stated that he was more into helping the balance of the Universe than running around fighting one Super-Villain. It has been openly acknowledged that he is gay and a fan of Jimmy Buffett. He is also friends with Hank, as he feels the two of them are similar. He is sometimes referred to as "Al", but whether this is his real name or merely short for Alchemist is uncertain. He has an open hatred of the Internet due to finding out his previous boyfriend was cheating on him via MySpace. It is revealed in "Everybody Comes to Hank's" that he was previously in a relationship with Shore Leave, but that the latter erased his memory of it because The Alchemist had become too "clingy." In "OSI Love You", he and Shore Leave have an amorous video chat implying they got back together.

Original Team Venture
 Dr. Jonas Venture Sr. (voiced by Paul Boocock): Deceased father of Dr. Rusty Venture, Jonas Junior, and as of season 7, it is revealed that he is also The Monarch's father. He was the foremost super scientist and adventurer in the world of his time. He created what is now known as Venture Industries and led the original Team Venture. While his public reputation was of a brilliant scientist, adventurer, and superhero, in reality, Jonas was a manipulative, sociopathic womanizer of questionable morals and ethics and was considered by the Guild to have been a greater villain than any of those he fought. He seemed to have considered Rusty as an unplanned and unwanted birth, and as a result, he generally ignored his son's existence in favor of drinking, partying, and sex. When he did pay attention to Rusty, he also subjected him to years of emotional manipulation and abuse. Season 7 revealed his most egregious act that would define the history of the entire series. He blackmailed his best friend Blue Morpho with a sex tape of him cheating on his wife into doing his dirty work for him, forcing Morpho's sidekick, Kano, into Team Venture, and impregnating Morpho's wife under the guise of "assisting" with their infertility issues. Morpho's wife has a baby through Jonas who would later grow up to be The Monarch. When the Morpho was killed in a plane crash, Jonas transferred his brain into a robot body and called him Venturion, an act that disgusted and horrified the original Team Venture. When Venturion malfunctioned and attacked Rusty Venture, Kano fatally disabled it, and Jonas disposed of its remains. Venturion's body was captured by Dr. Zinn and the Guild of Calamitous Intent who reprogrammed him into a villain called "Vendata." He later confronts and kills Jonas by ejecting him into space. Team Venture recovered his remains and embedded them in the ProBLEM device on the station which kept him in stasis until he could be saved. The ProBLEM was found by his son, JJ years later after the Gargantua-1 crashed on Earth. Unaware of what was inside it, he placed it in the lobby of Ventech headquarters as an art piece but was wired into the security and technology of the building. His brain, however, was still alive and thus used the connection to the building's security and technology to upload his consciousness to haunt Dr. Venture and his family. Through the building's wi-fi, he reveals to his son Rusty and the original Team Venture his real purpose for Venturion/Vendata: to transfer his consciousness into Vendata's brain and using the robot as a temporary vessel until Rusty cloned him a new body. This plan was foiled by Vendata/Blue Morpho who destroys the ProBLEM machine in a fight with Jonas in virtual reality, presumably killing them both.
 The Action Man, whose real name is Rodney (voiced by Christopher McCulloch): A retired American supersoldier with flatulence problems and "plastic knees" that hinder his movements. He married Major Tom's widow, Jeannie, after Tom's tragic accident. Like Jonas, he wasn't well trained with children and was hinted to have had some bad moments with young Rusty. He had a habit of waking up Rusty Venture back in the old days by placing an unloaded gun against the sleeping boy's head and pulling the trigger, in which he said "not today, Rusty". According to Rose, Rodney was a womanizer and a junkie, both of which he denied, claiming it was all in the past and never cheated on Jeanie, which is most likely a lie. "Action Man" is also the name of Hasbro's original 12 Inch GI Joe figures, released outside the United States. The Action Man moved to a retirement community in Boca Raton, Florida, where he is alone following the death of Jeannie. He briefly had Dr. Entmann as a roommate, only to accidentally crush him with his rocking chair while Dr. Entmann was in a shrunken-down state. He later dates fellow retired superhero, and Billy Quizboy's mother, Rose and moves in with Colonel Gentleman. 
 Colonel Horace Gentleman (voiced by Christopher McCulloch impersonating Sean Connery): Retired member of the original Team Venture and later ersatz leader of the reformed Team Venture. He is a Scottish gentleman and adventurer in the vein of Allan Quatermain and James Bond. The influence is apparent in the similarity of his voice to that of Sean Connery, who has played both characters in movies. He dresses in an old-fashioned British suit, complete with cane and fedora. It is briefly implied that he is a pederast and this was later confirmed by the creators. In the second season, Hank and Dean find him apparently dead of unspecified causes; however, it is revealed in "Now Museum-Now You Don't" that he was merely in a diabetic coma and is still alive. He is an ethnic/gender chauvinist, and has a penchant for writing out random lists in his notebook. He briefly bears a grudge against Rusty Venture for breaking the heart of his stepdaughter, Dr. Quymn, whom he has retained some affection for. Col. Gentleman lives in Tangier, it formerly being a haven for the world's elite and greatest intellectuals, but in recent years he has realized that he is the only one left, and is dejected that Kiki has broken up with him for the last time. At the end of season 5, he realizes that there is no reason for him to stay in Tangier anymore and moves back to the United States, becoming the Action Man's new roommate.
 Kano (voiced by Christopher McCulloch): Retired member of the original Team Venture. He is a master of the martial arts and an accomplished pilot and was likely inspired by the Green Hornet's assistant Kato. In earlier episodes, he never speaks and only communicates by way of origami and sparse gestures; however this is attributed to a vow of silence he'd taken as revealed in the episode "ORB". The vow was made when he took a great man from the world, which Brock believed was Jonas Venture Sr. As Col. Gentleman described him, his hands are "powerful enough to crush a boulder, yet delicate enough to crush a butterfly." Although not a villain, his silent demeanor, fighting skills and brute strength all correspond with the bodyguard/henchman archetype found in many works of fiction, with particular similarities to Oddjob. In addition to his skill in fighting and origami, Kano also appears to be a capable aircraft pilot. Kano has also displayed an ability to breathe fire in the episode "Now Museum-Now You Don't". On the DVD commentary, it is revealed that this is where his name originates in that it is short for "Volcano". Season 7 revealed that Kano was originally the bodyguard of the Blue Morpho, The Monarch's father. Kano was forced into the original Team Venture away from the Blue Morpho after Jonas had blackmailed Morpho. When Jonas resurrected the Blue Morpho as the cyborg Venturion after his death in a plane crash, Venturion malfunctioned and attacked Rusty, forcing Kano to snap his neck. According to the other members of the original team, Kano never spoke again after this event, thus "the great man" whom Kano killed before taking his vow of silence.
 Otto Aquarius (voiced by T. Ryder Smith): Retired member of the original Team Venture. An exiled son of Atlantis, he is half-human and half-Atlantean, which grants him a greatly extended life-span and the power to communicate telepathically with sea creatures. Most recently, he has converted to either the Church of Jesus Christ of Latter-day Saints (according to the special features section of the Season 1 DVD) or the Jehovah's Witnesses (according to Christopher McCulloch's blog), though his bizarre appearance often sabotages his attempts at evangelism. Due to his newfound faith, he is now a pacifist which seems to confirm that he is a Jehovah's Witness.
 Dr. Entmann (voiced by Stephen DeStefano): A tiny man that was left abandoned in a nuclear fallout shelter. In his previous heroic incarnation he was 15 feet tall, flabby, and curly haired and went by the name Humongeloid. Brock Samson finds Dr. Entmann in a disused and abandoned lab below the Venture Compound, where he had been trapped for some 30 years, ever since an experiment to shrink him went disastrously wrong. Dr. Entmann moves in with Action Man, and is later killed when Action Man crushes him by accident.
 Swifty (voiced by Brendon Small): An African-American boxer, and former bodyguard to Dr. Jonas Venture. In flashbacks, Swifty is shown using a pair of jet-powered boots. He currently suffers from dementia from years of boxing and is employed as a janitor on Spider-Skull Island.
 Hector (voiced by Brendon Small): A Hispanic boy and childhood friend of Rusty Venture. Seen in a flashback, he used an Aztec calendar to prevent an arrow from injuring Jonas Venture. Hector then joined the original Team Venture as Rusty's companion. However, as revealed in "Powerless in the Face of Death", in the present day Rusty has no recollection of Hector or their adventures together. Hector reveals that he has been living in a part of the Venture compound closed off by Rusty years prior, unaware that it had been closed, or that Jonas Venture had died, at which point Rusty unceremoniously evicts him. Hector appears to be the proxy of Hadji from Jonny Quest in the original Team Venture.
 Ook Ook: A cave man-like member of the team. In the present day, Ook Ook's body is encased inside a block of ice for unknown reasons.

O.S.I. 
The Office of Secret Intelligence is a branch of the United States government that handles supervillain activity, both combatting groups of supervillains or assisting super scientists and superheroes with their Guild of Calamitous Intent-assigned archenemies. A pastiche of G.I. Joe and S.H.I.E.L.D., in the 1980s they fought against the supervillain organization S.P.H.I.N.X. in the Pyramid Wars, during which the original S.P.H.I.N.X. was defeated. The O.S.I. operates from a hovering base based on the helicarrier and seems to answer to a division known as the Misters who are the go-between with the "Secret President."
 General Timothy Treister (voiced by Toby Huss): Commander of the O.S.I., he's a tough, no-nonsense, highly energetic military man. He is first mentioned in "Mid-Life Chrysalis", but first appears in person in "The Family That Slays Together, Stays Together"; after Brock Samson goes on the run from the hit put on him by Molotov Cocktease, Treister leads the effort to find and debrief Samson. He later shows up to help coordinate between the O.S.I., S.P.H.I.N.X., the Guild of Calamitous Intent, the Revenge Society, and the Peril Partnership during Zeus and Zero's rampage across the world's sidekicks. Finally, in "Operation P.R.O.M.", Treister reveals he is dying of testicular cancer, but has been fooled by Mister Doe and Mister Cardholder into thinking he has been turned into a Hulk after experimental gamma ray chemotherapy. After finally meeting with Col. Gathers, revealing he has discovered Doe and Cardholder are Guild double agents, he entrusts O.S.I. back to Gathers and shoots himself off into space in order to have his cancer cured by "alien technology". Treister reappears in "All this and Gargantua-2", where his frozen body is taken aboard the titular ship and upon being awoken believes that Billy and JJ are aliens and goes on a rampage after misinterpreting them as being hostile. He and JJ sacrifice themselves to stop Gargantua-2's self-destruction from hurting anyone, during which it is revealed that, as a result of the solar radiation his body was subjected to while he was in space, Treister actually is a Hulk-like creature.
 Mister Doe and Mister Cardholder (voiced by Doc Hammer and Christopher McCulloch, respectively): Two Mister-level agents of O.S.I. They first appear in "The Lepidopterists" to assist Dr. Jonas Venture Jr. in his fight against his newly assigned archenemy The Monarch, as they plan on capturing The Monarch for killing so many previous archenemies. They regularly appear as assistants to General Treister and are even made to guard the Venture family during "Blood of the Father, Heart of Steel" before Sgt. Hatred is assigned to them. In "Operation P.R.O.M." they reveal to Col. Gathers that they are Guild moles sent to trick Treister into thinking he has been turned into a Hulk, to prove to the President that Treister should be removed from his position and they should take his place. Their plan is foiled when Treister reveals to Gathers that he has discovered that they are moles and that Mile High has been working for him as well.
 Gen. Hunter Gathers (voiced by Christopher McCulloch): Brock's former mentor from when he was in training for the O.S.I. Gathers has since gone into hiding after undergoing sex reassignment surgery (SRS), taking a job as a dancer at Night 'N Ales, a strip club. The character is modeled on Hunter S. Thompson, and his name is a play on the term hunter-gatherer. Other than Brock, Gathers was the only O.S.I. agent who believed the Guild was still in existence in the late eighties, as seen in "The Invisible Hand of Fate". Despite being extraordinarily eccentric, he seems to sincerely care about his job and defending his country. He also taught Brock the strict rule of never killing women or children, as that differentiated them from the "baddies". This is something he used to his advantage when he went rogue from the O.S.I. who then sent Brock to kill him. He is apparently a member of Molotov Cocktease's "Black Hearts" assassination guild, as shown in the scene following the end credits of "The Family That Slays Together, Stays Together (Part II)". However, despite the SRS, he still has the same face and voice as before—including a perpetual five o'clock shadow. The sex reassignment and apparent betrayal of the O.S.I. were revealed in the Season 4 opener to have been an elaborate ruse to infiltrate the Black Hearts; when Gathers and Samson were captured by Sphinx agents, Gathers revealed himself as an undercover Sphinx officer. In Pinstripes & Poltergeists, it is revealed that Gathers and other members of the O.S.I., disgusted with its ineffectual bureaucracy, eventually quit the O.S.I. and took S.P.H.I.N.X's name and equipment to form an organization capable of covertly and effectively combating super-powered villains against whom the O.S.I is powerless. S.P.H.I.N.X. seeks to terminate villains who do not abide by the rules of organized villainy mandated by institutions like the Guild of Calamitous Intent. Hunter surrenders command of S.P.H.I.N.X. to 21 after he is promoted to O.S.I.'s General.
 Shore Leave/Holy Diver (voiced by Doc Hammer): A former O.S.I. agent fired for violating O.S.I.'s don't ask, don't tell policy. Shore Leave had joined Hunter Gathers in S.P.H.I.N.X.. In Pinstripes & Poltergeists, it is revealed he and Mile High faked being a couple as well as their conversion to religious fanaticism, for their cover. He has started flirting with the Alchemist in the last episode of the 4th season and ended up making out with him. It is also revealed in "Everybody Comes To Hank's" that he and the Alchemist were briefly in a sexual relationship, but Shore Leave broke it off and wiped the Alchemist's memory when he became too "possessive" and dumped his boyfriend to move in with Shore Leave.
 Mile High/Sky Pilot (voiced by Christopher McCulloch): A former O.S.I. agent fired for violating O.S.I.'s don't ask, don't tell policy. He had joined Hunter Gathers in Sphinx. In the episode Pinstripes & Poltergeists, it is revealed he and Shore Leave faked being a couple as well as their conversion to religious fanaticism, for their cover. His name is a reference to the mile high club, as well as to the 1968 song "Sky Pilot" by Eric Burdon & The Animals. In the season finale "Operation: P.R.O.M." it is revealed he was a double-agent working for the O.S.I..
 Dr. Vulcano (voiced by Brendon Small): The surgeon who performs sex reassignment surgery on Hunter Gathers in "Assassinanny 911". He later is seen assisting the Nazis in their creation of the dog containing Hitler's soul and removing H.E.L.P.eR's head from Brock's chest in "Blood of the Father, Heart of Steel", where he is also revealed to be a member of S.P.H.I.N.X. under Hunter Gathers' command. In "O.S.I. Love You", Dr. Vulcano is seen to have been recruited into O.S.I. 
 Headshot (voiced by Bill Hader): Headshot is O.S.I.'s top marksman, who worked on the mission to capture Monstroso and Molotov Cocktease. He and Amber are in a relationship. In a moment of infidelity, he attempts to examine who he believes to be the captive Molotov Cocktease only to discover Amber in her place. Although more shocking to him is the truth about Amber's hair color. It is heavily implied that Headshot accidentally shot and killed the head of the Guild, The Sovereign, while the latter was escaping in eagle form. It was later confirmed that the Sovereign had died, but it is unknown whether Headshot's action gained any acknowledgment.
 Amber Gold (voiced by Paget Brewster): A female operative of O.S.I. She is left to examine Molotov Cocktease in captivity, and when believing that the Nozzle has detected a foreign object in her eyepatch, takes her eyes off Molotov, allowing Molotov to escape her constraints and disguise herself as Amber, using Amber's wig of platinum blonde hair that she uses to cover her own shorter natural blonde hair. She is in a relationship with Headshot, although it becomes strained when he discovers her blonde hair is a wig and feels she is hiding other things from him. She is also having an affair with Brock Samson.
 Afterburner (voiced by Doc Hammer): A ninja operative of O.S.I. who wears a complete bodysuit akin to Snake Eyes of G.I. Joe. Just like Snake Eyes, he wears the suit to hide his horribly disfiguring burn scars.
 Shuttle Cock: An O.S.I. operative themed after an astronaut who wields a badminton racket as a weapon. He is a double-agent killed by Molotov Cocktease.
 Slap Chop: An O.S.I. martial artist operative resembling Iron Fist and Vince Offer, known for pitching the "Slap Chop" kitchen utensil on infomercials. He is a double-agent killed by Molotov Cocktease.
 Bum Rush: An O.S.I. operative themed after a homeless beggar who keeps his weapons in a shopping cart. He is a double-agent killed by Molotov Cocktease.
 Tank Top: An O.S.I. operative who wears an armored tank top that has a tank cannon on it. He is double-agent killed by Molotov Cocktease.
 Snoopy (voiced by John Hodgman): A meek O.S.I. operative who works on the bridge and assists General Gathers.

Archvillains and henchmen

The Guild of Calamitous Intent
The Guild of Calamitous Intent are the primary antagonists in the series. They are an organization of supervillains that serves as a trade union for villains, providing benefits such as health insurance and sets the rules and standards of conduct between its members and their enemies who tend to be the superheroes and super-scientists of the world. The Guild acts as a stabilizing influence on the world of super-villainy, as without it they would be unchecked free agents with no rules restricting their behavior. The Guild not only serves to organize the world's supervillains into an organized force, but it also controls and limits the villains from total mass destruction, murder, and mayhem by restricting their attacks to Guild-approved targets. Early in the series, it was led by a mysterious figure known only as "The Sovereign", and a group of villains called the Council of Thirteen. The current incarnation of the Guild is implied to be a haven for missing and/or presumed deceased rock stars. In Season 6, most of the Council of 13 is killed by the Sovereign in order to consolidate his control over the Guild and as part of a plan to defeat the supernatural, supervillain group, The Investors. After The Sovereign is accidentally killed by O.S.I., the remaining survivors of The Sovereign's purges, Dr. Mrs. The Monarch, Dr. Phineas Phage, Dr. Z, Red Mantle, and Dragoon forges a new Council of 13, surviving Revenge Society members with help from Dr. Henry Killinger after he killed the Investors in order to restore the balance between the OSI and the Guild. He declined the role of Sovereign and left control of the Guild to the council. Season six introduces the New York branch of the Guild, which is made up of the most dangerous supervillains the organization has to offer. It is later revealed that the original Guild charter does not mandate that the Council must have exactly thirteen members, and members of the Council cannot be actively arching their enemies.

The current incarnation of the Guild was apparently founded around 1959 by Phantom Limb's grandfather, but its history can be traced back to the late Victorian era, where it was a heroic organization led by Colonel Lloyd Venture, Rusty Venture's grandfather, dedicated to the protection of an enigmatic sphere known as the "ORB". The Guild then split over how to use the ORB, with Fantomas founding the Guild of Calamitous Intent (who wanted to use the ORB to control mankind) in 1910 while Lloyd founded the modern version of the OSI (who wanted to use the ORB to help mankind).

The Monarch
The Monarch (voiced by Christopher McCulloch): Dr. Venture's self-styled nemesis, whose real name is Malcom Fitzcarraldo. He is obsessed with monarch butterflies, which he claims raised him as a child after he survived the plane wreck which killed his parents. He attended State University where he began arching Dr. Venture, but for reasons as yet unrevealed (though possible making fun of his love of butterflies and thinking he was a "closet case"). He then began working for a variety of villains, and was employed by Phantom Limb as Shadowman 9, until he became The Monarch and seduced Dr. Girlfriend. Though he frequently describes himself as Dr. Venture's nemesis, their rivalry resides completely in The Monarch's imagination. In reality, Dr. Venture considers him more a nuisance than a genuine threat, and is even fine with leaving his sons in The Monarch's care due to his general incompetence. He is also the unofficial arch-enemy of Captain Sunshine, to whom he is far more ruthless, even brutally killing Wonder Boy III and sending the hero his charred corpse. The Monarch eventually lost his privilege to Arch Rusty after it was discovered that he was not a Guild-sanctioned villain, and upon registering killed five heroes and super-scientists he had been assigned to before being given the job of Arching Rusty's brother, Jonas Jr. until The Monarch uses the Guild clause of "prior escalation" to be able to attack Rusty again. At the end of season one, he was convicted of murder and sentenced to prison after being framed by the Phantom Limb. In the second season, he escapes and begins to rebuild his criminal operation, reuniting with Dr. Girlfriend in the process and eventually marrying her. As of the third season, the two have moved into Phantom Limb's old mansion in a gated community called Malice. In the fifth season of Venture Brothers, there is a photo The Monarch finds while undercover at the Venture compound of him as a toddler playing with Rusty and accompanied by his parents and the Venture family, suggesting The Monarch and Rusty could have been childhood friends. At the end of season 5, his Cocoon ship, his home, and all his henchmen were destroyed by Sgt. Hatred, forcing The Monarch, his wife, and Henchman 21 to move into The Monarch's abandoned childhood home in Newark, New Jersey. He also loses his rights to fight Dr. Venture, as the loss of his cocoon and henchmen lowered his Guild ranking substantially. In the episode "Faking Miracles" The Monarch discovered that his father was the Blue Morpho. The Monarch then took up his father's hero identity and, along with Henchman 21, began killing New York Guild members who were antagonizing Dr. Venture so that he could move up the waiting list. In Season 7, it is implied that The Monarch's mother slept with Jonas Venture to conceive him, as part of a blackmail Jonas was doing to his father, making him the half-brother of Dr. Venture.

Henchman 21
Henchman 21/Gary Fischer, briefly S.P.H.I.N.X. Commander and occasionally the Viceroy (voiced by Doc Hammer): A pop-culture geek who at the beginning of the series is a henchman for The Monarch, always seen with his closest friend Henchman 24. He writes "Flight of The Monarch", a tell-all that starts the chain of events ending in The Monarch's incarceration. After the death of Henchman 24, he goes into heavy combat training and emerges with sufficient strength and martial prowess to contend with Brock Samson. He and Samson then work together to defeat Monstroso, a common enemy. Henchman 21 still speaks to what he believes is Henchman 24's ghost, though Henchman 24's ghost suggests that he is only a figment of Henchman 21's imagination (simultaneously confirmed and refuted in Operation: P.R.O.M.), in echoes of Rudyard Kipling's classic story "The Man Who Would Be King". In "Operation P.R.O.M.", 21 was offered a chance to work with the anti-unlicensed superhero team, S.P.H.I.N.X. He found he enjoyed working "with guys who actually know what they're doing" for once, and began to question his dedication to the ways of The Monarch and evil in general. By the end of the episode, he realizes that being a villain is not for him, and quits the ranks of The Monarch. In "From the Ladle to the Grave: The Story of Shallow Gravy" 2011 Venture Brothers special which takes place after "Operation P.R.O.M," he is interviewed while wearing a S.P.H.I.N.X. uniform with his face censored, and using the Viceroy name. After "Operation P.R.O.M." Gary becomes the commander of S.P.H.I.N.X., which does not last long when the former members of the original S.P.H.I.N.X. take over, forcing the O.S.I. to shut S.P.H.I.N.X. down for good. Gary lives in the backyard of the Venture Compound, as S.P.H.I.N.X.'s headquarters is destroyed by Dr. Venture and Sgt. Hatred when they believe Gary has planted bombs under the Venture Compound, as he can identify them as his own painted the colors of The Monarch, when they were in fact planted by The Monarch and Dr. Mrs. The Monarch in their earlier infiltration attempt. He later helps Hank and Dermott to try to get to Teddy by adopting his "Viceroy" moniker in a bank robbery to get into the Dunwitch Asylum for the Criminally Insane. After attempting to help Hatred retrieve Dr. Venture, he leads The Monarch henchmen in overthrowing the furious moppets and decides to rejoin the ranks of The Monarch, returning not out of loyalty to The Monarch or the henchman lifestyle, but because The Monarch is the only friend he has left. By Season 7, 21 finds himself the only remaining henchman of The Monarch. He assists The Monarch when he becomes the new Blue Morpho by killing off Dr. Venture's archenemies, though he finds himself burdened by guilt for doing so, as he has never intentionally killed someone before. He attempts to end the killing by kidnapping several of the archenemies he would have had to go after and merely holding them captive until The Monarch was made Dr. Venture's official antagonist again, but one of them cannibalizes and kills the others. At the end of Season 7, the Guild offers Gary a chance to become a supervillain and leave The Monarch. He declines, declaring the monarch is his best friend, and he wants to help him with his grudge.

Henchman 24
Henchman 24, (voiced by Christopher McCulloch): a tall, thin man with voice characteristics resembling comic Ray Romano and was described by 21 in the first episode of the second season as resembling Jerry Seinfeld with a unibrow. He served as Shadowman 24 for Phantom Limb at the same time The Monarch was Shadowman 9. The Monarch promised to make him his "number 2" in return for a favor, a promise which has never been carried out. Number 24's powder blue Nissan Stanza becomes the replacement Monarch Mobile after The Monarch's lair is destroyed but is promptly stolen by a fleeing prostitute. The Stanza later inexplicably reappears in the garage of The Monarch's Cocoon. It was heavily damaged when the Cocoon crashed in the Grand Canyon. The Monarch doesn't remember much about 24 besides the fact he thinks his voice sounds like aforementioned Ray Romano. A former factory worker before he joined up with The Monarch, 24 has revealed to Dean that his ex-girlfriend married his father and that he has always wanted to be a cabinet maker. Number 24 dies in an explosion at the end of the season three finale. However, a deleted scene reveals that 24 had faked his death so as to leave the henchman lifestyle behind and is now working at the gas station his father owns. His supposed skull makes appearances throughout season 4 as an object with whom #21 converses as they did previously. In Pinstripes & Poltergeists, #24 is apparently a ghost that has decided to haunt #21 due to lack of options, the other choices being the Cocoon lair, which gets blown up frequently, or his ex-girlfriend from when he was 15, which would have been 'way too creepy' as she no longer likes him 'in that way'. In Operation: P.R.O.M., it is revealed that 24 was not actually a ghost throughout Season 4, but a figment of 21's grief-stricken imagination. 21's acceptance of this allows him to finally accept 24's "death". Although he still harbors a suspicion that someone is responsible for 24's death, and decides that Tim Tom and Kevin are the ones responsible, and blaming them allows The Monarch's henchmen to overthrow them.

Dr. Mrs. The Monarch
Dr. Mrs. The Monarch, née Dr. Sheila Girlfriend (voiced by Doc Hammer): Wife and assistant to The Monarch. For the most of her career as number 2 to The Monarch wore Jackie Kennedy's famous short pink jacket and pillbox hat, and shares her Long Island accent. Her comically deep voice is a result of her previously having had a severe smoking addiction, and is a parody of the former First Lady's relatively low voice for a woman.

Tim-Tom and Kevin
Tim-Tom and Kevin (voiced by Christopher McCulloch and Doc Hammer, respectively): Achondroplastic dwarves who were Dr. Girlfriend's assistants in her solo career as Lady Au Pair. They apparently remain on good terms with her, helping in her application to be the Order of the Triad's nemesis, helping her at her wedding, and organizing the rebuilding of the cocoon after its destruction. They speak to Dr. Girlfriend in a respectful manner, but outside of her presence, they are both surly, foul-mouthed, and utterly psychotic as they seem to ferociously attack with their matching stilettos with very little provocation.

Watch and Ward
Watch and Ward (voiced by Christopher McCulloch and Doc Hammer, respectively): The communications and operations liaisons for the Guild of Calamitous Intent, speaking with prospective protagonists and antagonists respectively to adequately provide proper arching assistance. Watch wears a tactical eyepatch over his left eye and appears to be bald, while Ward wears one over his right and has hair sticking out from beneath his cowl. The two frequently get into arguments based on actual conversations between McCulloch and Hammer, such as Ward being upset that Watch drank his juice box.

Dr. Henry Killinger
Dr. Henry Killinger (voiced by Christopher McCulloch): A highly skilled businessman and negotiator and demonstrates a keen understanding of legal matters, particularly tax law. He is shown to have magical abilities, although the nature and extent of his powers are unclear. Some characters have a great deal of trouble understanding him when he speaks. Killinger's major appearances have twice involved spontaneously offering his services as a strategist, business consultant, and/or motivational coach to main characters, free of charge, in the episodes "I Know Why The Caged Bird Kills" and "The Doctor Is Sin". In both cases, his influence results in a substantial increase in the efficiency with which his clients conduct their affairs. Although, as a supervillain, Killinger is capable of dispassionately murdering adversaries, he is also shown to be capable of quickly forming warm friendships, as well as acts of great kindness. He develops an avuncular relationship with the Venture boys in "The Doctor Is Sin", to the extent that the two of them refer to him as "Uncle Henry".

The Sovereign
The Sovereign (voiced by Christopher McCulloch, David Bowie impersonated by James Urbaniak): The mysterious entity who runs the Guild of Calamitous Intent. He communicates principally by use of telescreens which distort his face and voice. He was seen to be David Bowie, but "O.S.I Love You" reveals that he is a shapeshifter who often appears as Bowie. It is unclear if the Sovereign is the actual in-universe David Bowie. In "All this and Gargantua-2", he murders most of the Council of 13, and masterminds an attack on Gargantua-2 as part of a grand scheme to kill the Investors, and is killed in eagle form by Headshot.

Iggy Pop
Iggy Pop (impersonated by Christopher McCulloch): American rock musician and one of the Sovereign's henchmen. He can create spheres of energy that explode when he issues the command "Pop". He betrays the Sovereign in favor of Phantom Limb, but the Sovereign later kills him for his betrayal.

Klaus Nomi
Klaus Nomi (impersonated by Christopher McCulloch): German singer and one of the Sovereign's henchmen. He can sing in a hypersonic voice and his bowtie can fly off as a projectile. He betrays the Sovereign in favor of Phantom Limb, but the Sovereign later kills him for his betrayal.

Eon
Eon: The Sovereign's new bodyguard, bearing a striking resemblance to longtime Bowie collaborator Brian Eno.

Monstroso
Monstroso (voiced by Christopher McCulloch) is both a lawyer with the Mammoth Corporation and a supervillain licensed with the Guild of Calamitous Intent. His size is enormous, with a lap sufficient for Dr. Girlfriend and a brace of four additional revelers. Monstroso is prosperous enough to have employed the bulk of The Monarch's men while he was in prison, no doubt due to his lawyer and supervillain vocations. In "The Silent Partners", Monstroso has the Investors kidnap Billy Quizboy, and it is revealed that he is dying of heart failure and requires a transplant from King Gorilla. Billy was chosen because of his skills, and the Investors would return the favor by forging documents signed by Billy to "officially" give him credentials to be legally recognized as a doctor and "immortality" for his recognized fame as a great surgeon because the surgery is so difficult. Billy completes the transplant, and in the Post credits scene, Monstroso appears to be recovering from his surgery, although he appears to be unaware that he is no longer on his boat but actually at the Sphinx headquarters on the Venture compound. However, in "Operation: P.R.O.M.", Monstroso is rescued by Molotov, and it is revealed that he and Molotov are in a romantic relationship. After the limousine, in which he is being rescued by Molotov, falls off a cliff, Brock finds it in the season 5 premiere, and finds Monstroso's "body" was a fake, and with no trace of Molotov. He and Molotov are eventually captured by O.S.I. in "O.S.I. Love You", but he is killed by the Investors after he reveals too many guild secrets to Brock.

Torrid
Torrid (voiced by Christopher McCulloch) is the arch of the Order of the Triad. He is first assigned as their arch enemy in  "Fallen Arches" when he kidnaps Triana Orpheus to the Torrid Zone. He has fire-based powers. In  "Showdown at Cremation Creek", he steals the All-Seeing Orb, during which The Alchemist and Jefferson Twilight start to doubt the utility of having an archenemy. Torrid's final appearance is when he attempts to open a portal to the Second World, unwittingly being sucked into it and then summoning an elder god that the Triad are unable to defeat, leaving Orpheus' protege the Outrider to save them all.

Truckules
Truckules (voiced by Christopher McCulloch): A truck- and Hercules-themed supervillain, and former Number One for Dr. Mrs. The Monarch, from whom she learned how to hotwire any vehicle. His upperbody resembles Optimus Prime's, and is so wide that when he attends The Monarch's wedding he requests two seats.

The Intangible Fancy
The Intangible Fancy (voiced by Christopher McCulloch): A supervillain who is intangible. He attends Dr. Venture's yard sale to buy something, but is caught in the fight that ensues. He is later questioned by the Council of 13 after attempting to smuggle contraband.

The Investors
The Investors (Caecius: voiced by Doc Hammer; Skiron: voiced by John Hodgman; Lips: voiced by T. Ryder Smith): A mysterious group of supervillains who first appear in "Pinstripes & Poltergeists" as members of the Guild aligned with Monstroso. They seem to have omnipotence and are able to grant the dreams and wishes of anyone by entering into "contracts"; promising those who deal with them their desired dream in exchange for a hefty price. They are on the top of both O.S.I. and the reformed S.P.H.I.N.X.'s list of targets, but they cannot be captured. They later appear in "O.S.I. Love You" disguised as O.S.I. Mister level operatives Mister Frost (voiced by Christopher McCulloch), Mister Sample (voiced by Dana Snyder), and Mister Yourname (voiced by Brendon Small), the last of which has not been properly inducted to interrogate those on board about what has happened to Monstroso and Molotov Cocktease. They kill Monstroso during Brock's interrogation earlier in the day. The ruse works until the actual Mister operatives come to interrogate, whereupon Gathers discovers the Investors have already left with all of the documentation of their own debriefing. They are present for the opening of Gargantua-2 looking to "collect" what they offered to JJ Venture by destroying the station, while The Sovereign planned to attack the station with the ultimate goal of killing the Investors before they came to "collect" from him as well. With the help of Phantom Limb, they successfully sabotage the station, escape The Sovereign, and then confront, Dr. Henry Killinger on Meteor Majeure, who kills them in a battle.

Augustus St. Cloud
Augustus St. Cloud (voiced by Christopher McCulloch, originally James Urbaniak) is the wealthy former rival of Billy's from their quiz show days, both having been collectors of sci-fi and Rusty Venture memorabilia. He first appears at Dr. Venture's tag sale, receiving the brunt of Baron Ünderbheit's attacks due to The Monarch's interference. He later appears amongst supervillains, despite not yet being an official member of the Guild. After giving a sizable donation to the Guild's Widows and Orphans charity, he is inducted into the Guild and allowed to pick from a group of archnemeses, but demands he get Billy Quizboy, with Watch and Ward acquiescing to his demands after another sizable donation. The arching of Billy comes to a head when Billy and Pete White must attempt to retrieve several items St. Cloud bought off of Dr. Venture to fund the Palaemon Project, discovering St. Cloud's Asian albino henchman "Pi Wai". After refusing to eat $1 worth of pennies, the exact value that Billy had beat St. Cloud in an eBay auction years earlier, Billy bests St. Cloud in a trivia contest once more, winning back Venture's hovercraft, needed to deal with the Palaemon Project mutants, and H.E.L.P.er, who had also been sold to St. Cloud. St. Cloud's signature features are his short and stout stature, deadpan voice, round dark glasses, and collection of ginger pageboy style wigs. Because of his incredible wealth and somewhat bratty personality, St. Cloud tends to use money to persuade people or purchase anything that would help him get his way.

The Council of Thirteen
The governing body of the Guild of Calamitous Intent. Known members are:

Council of the Sovereign
Councilman 1: Vendata (voiced by Doc Hammer): A cyborg created by Dr. Jonas Venture Sr. to hold the consciousness and memories of human beings and in particular, of his friend Blue Morpho, who was killed in a plane crash. Originally called "Venturion," he malfunctioned and tried to strangle young Rusty but was destroyed by Kano. This incident influenced both characters greatly as Rusty has recurring nightmares of this, while Kano was so distraught at having to kill his former partner, he took an eternal vow of silence. Jonas Venture threw out his remains which were found by Dr. Z who reprogrammed him into a supervillain renamed "Vendata." As a villain, he was a member of a gang of young supervillains who tried to carry out an unauthorized arch of Jonas aboard Gargantua-1. Vendata deliberately opened the station's bay doors after a confrontation with Jonas, resulting in the Movie Night Massacre. The Sovereign appeared to have rewarded him for this incident by giving him the number one seat on the council. O.S.I. tried a sting operation where they had Ghost Robot act an informant to try to get information on the Council of Thirteen out of Vendata, but was seriously damaged by Brock Samson. Brock's attack restores his original memories as the Blue Morpho. He traveled to the Ventech Tower in New York City to confront Jonas again, this time as his old Blue Morpho self. Jonas through the ProBLEM machine reveals that he wanted to use Vendata/Venturion as a temporary body to host his consciousness, while Rusty clones a new body for Jonas. Blue Morpho's consciousness and memories would be erased in the process. He and Jonas apparently are killed when the fight their virtual selves have inside the ProBLEM machine destroy their physical selves.
Councilman 2: Wild Fop (voiced by Christopher McCulloch): A Restoration-themed supervillain who first appears in an informational video given to Dr. Orpheus after he is approved for a supervillain. Killed by his dogs in "All this and Gargantua 2".
Councilman 3: Red Mantle (voiced by Doc Hammer): A magic-wielding supervillain with elemental powers, who has Dragoon attached to his neck. The two are collectively dubbed "Red Dragoon" in season 6.
Councilman 4: Boggles, the Clue Clown: A clown-themed supervillain and former archenemy to Captain Sunshine. He is a pastiche of the Joker and the Riddler, with Dragoon saying that his jokes were tedious and his riddles obvious. He is found dead of a heart attack, possibly as a result of his identity being revealed to Brock by Monstroso, his position filled by Dr. Phineas Phage.
Dr. Phineas Phage (voiced by Bill Hader in season 4, James Adomian in seasons 5, 6 and 7): A cybernetic bacteriophage-themed villain who has a group of henchmen called the "Pro-Teens". He first appears in "Pomp & Circuitry", where he is the Guild-assigned archenemy to Richard Impossible. Happening upon Phantom Limb's confrontation with Professor Impossible, he is attacked by the escaped villain but manages to survive and alert the Guild. In "Any Which Way But Zeus", he has a cameo appearance alongside the other villains and heroes whose followers were kidnapped. Later, following the funeral of Boggles the Clue Clown in the season 5 episode "Bot Seeks Bot", Phage is appointed by the Sovereign to become the new Councilman #4. In order to earn this position, he memorized the entire book of Guild law to pass his exam, but later is still outwitted by Dr. Mrs. The Monarch in an argument on the subject. In "All this and Gargantua 2" he is the only other Council member to survive, escaping with Dr. Mrs. The Monarch but parting ways with her after getting out of Guild HQ. After the Guild reforms, they bring Phage back on as a Councilman. However, in "The Terminus Mandate," he is not seen among the current members of the council. He is subsequently revealed to be in a coma in "The Saphrax Protocol" due to injuries he suffered when his cybernetic body caused the teleporter he was using to malfunction.
Councilman 5: Dr. Z: See below.
Councilman 6: Monseñor (voiced by Larry Murphy): A priest and lucha libre-themed supervillain. He delivers the eulogy at Boggles' funeral. Killed by poison gas in "All This and Gargantua 2".
Councilman 7: Don Hell (voiced by Christopher McCulloch): A magic-wielding supervillain who owns a night club for other supervillains named Don Hell's. Upon discovering Dr. Venture and Billy Quizboy in his night club, he attempts to provide entertainment to his patrons by torturing them until Dr. Mrs. The Monarch reveals it is a violation of Guild bylaws to do such things to another member's archenemy without approval. He is loosely based on the real life New York City club promoter Don Hill. Killed by drinking acid in "All This and Gargantua 2".
Councilman 8: Dragoon (voiced by Christopher McCulloch): A dragoon-themed supervillain whose head has since been sewn onto the body of Red Mantle. He is highly critical of fellow supervillains, and believes that all magic is an abomination. Dragoon is slowly going senile, believing himself to be from the 16th century as well as mistaking real events for those from Wacky Races.  
Councilman 9: Steppenwolf (voiced by Christopher McCulloch): A werewolf-themed supervillain. He owns a car similar to that owned by the family in The Munsters. Killed by a car bomb in "All This and Gargantua 2".
Councilman 10: An insect-themed armored supervillain who was killed by a car bomb in "All This and Gargantua 2". The Art of the Venture Bros book mentions that the creators never settled on a name for this character but the name Omocha Bug may have been used in an early script.
Councilman 11: Mommy Longlegs (voiced by Paget Brewster): The only currently female member of the Council of Thirteen, she does not attend the congratulatory party for Phage as her grandchildren are coming to town for the weekend. Her silhouette resembles that of background character Mommy Longlegs, a spider-themed supervillainess, one among the many kidnapped by Zeus and Zero in "Any Which Way But Zeus".  Killed by gunshots fired by a Guild murderbot while making her escape from the Sovereign's headquarters in "All This and Gargantua-2".
Councilman 12: The Nerve (voiced by Christopher McCulloch): A supervillain who is a sentient nervous system with no body, floating in a transparent humanoid suit. Found dead in a dumpster in "All This and Gargantua 2".
Councilman 13: The Sovereign

Wide Wale
Wide Wale (voiced by Hal Lublin): A leader of the New York branch of the Guild, he is brought in to help shore up support for the Guild and the council after the events of Gargantua-2. He agrees to join only if he is given the arching rights to Dr. Venture. His real name is Chester Ong, and is the younger brother of Doctor Dugong, a scientist whom The Monarch seemingly killed. As a result of a laboratory accident, he has physical aspects of whales as part of his biology; these traits were inherited by his daughter Sirena. In Season 7, he forbids his daughter from seeing Hank Venture since he didn't approve of him. He later captures The Monarch and tells him that he plans to kill him out of revenge for his brother's death. He also tasks Hank with killing him but he refuses and just when Wide Wale is about to do it. Dr. Mrs. The Monarch and Red Death appear with Dr. Dugong who grew a new head, allowing him to survive The Monarch's attempt on his life before he went into hiding, provided by the OSI. Wide Wale is then faced with dealing with his daughter and brother who are angry that he didn't tell him about Dugong. In "The Terminus Mandate" he resigns from his seat on the council, as he is unable to let go of his personal vendettas though remains an ally to them.

Red Death
Red Death (voiced by Clancy Brown): A skinless red supervillain similar to the Red Skull. Despite of his terrifying visage and reputation, he is actually a kind and loving husband and Father. However, when arching or in times of anger or other elevated emotion, he slips into an evil persona with no hesitation to kill. In season 7, it is revealed that Red Death was a member of a gang of young Guild villains at the beginning of his career in the 1980s.

Original members
 Col. Lloyd Venture (August 24 1800s - November 15, 1940) (voiced by Christopher McCulloch): Grandfather of Dr. Jonas Venture Sr., great-grandfather to Dr. Thaddeus "Rusty" Venture and Dr. Jonas Venture Jr., and great-great-grandfather to Hank and Dean, Col. Venture was the leader of the Guild, a group set up to protect the Orb from falling into the wrong hands.
 Eugen Sandow (voiced by Paul Boocock): Famed German bodybuilder who served as Col. Venture's O.S.I. appointed bodyguard. In the flashbacks during the episode "Orb", he intimates in his phonograph diaries that he killed Col. Venture for attempting to discover the secrets of the Orb, the true purpose of O.S.I.'s watch over the Venture family, but in "The Revenge Society", it is revealed that he only broke the Orb and both he and Col. Venture hid this from their descendants and later bodyguards
 Aleister Crowley (voiced by Steven Rattazzi): Famed British occultist who sought to use the Orb for his own ends, believing that he had a right to it as the Orb's most recent owner, but was later forcibly ejected from the Guild's zeppelin for doing so.
 Fantômas (voiced by Christopher McCulloch): Famed French thief and ancestor of Phantom Limb who wants to use the Orb to rule the world. He is later kicked out of the Guild, and forms his own Guild of Calamitous Intent by recruiting Buddy Holly and the Big Bopper by attempting to convince them that the sousaphone was an instrument that belonged in rock music.
 Oscar Wilde (voiced by James Urbaniak): Famed Irish poet who upon Fantômas' suggestion to use the Orb for evil, denounces that the Guild should not be a "Guild of Calamitous Intent".
 Samuel Clemens (voiced by Paul Boocock): Famed American author and member of the original Guild who alerts fellow members that they are being chased by Nicola Tesla and his cadre of Avon Ladies.

Other members
 Brick Frog: A villain in a frog costume whose "superpower" is throwing bricks carried in a satchel.  
 Scare Bear: A mysterious villain who is always seen wearing a bloody bear costume and holding a knife. As it never speaks, its gender is unknown. It first appeared as an applicant to the Revenge Society in "Bright Lights, Dean City," where it entered Professor Impossible's office without notice and frightened the Revenge Society leadership. It later became a part of the Guild, appearing in the background at various events before having a larger role in "The Forecast Manufacturer," where it saved an injured Hank from dying in a blizzard and brought him to Dean's dorm, where Sirena was cheating on Hank with Dean. How it knew Sirena was Hank's girlfriend and would be at the dorm with Dean remains unclear.
 Flying Squid (voiced by Bill Hader): A squid-themed supervillain who first realizes the costume Shoreleave is wearing in the bar belongs to missing Guild member Sri Lankan Devil Bird. He then saves Dr. Venture from Don Hell by contacting The Monarch and Dr. Mrs. The Monarch to have them use guild law to intervene in the proceedings.
 Vespertina (voiced by Paget Brewster): A floral-themed supervillain who attempts to hit on Shoreleave in his Red-Throated Loon get up, but his campness turns her off.
 Sri Lankan Devil Bird: A four-armed supervillain who attempts to arch Dr. Venture in "The Doctor Is Sin". Brock kills him swiftly. His costume is later used by Shoreleave to enter Don Hell's night club under the name "Red-Throated Loon", but Flying Squid identifies it as the costume of his friend.
 Sunsational (voiced by Doc Hammer): A Solar System-themed supervillain who associates with a group of henchmen each themed after one of the planets, with himself being the Sun.
 Galacticon: A robotic supervillain akin to Galactus. O.S.I. disguises Ghost Robot as Galacticon to go on a date with Vendata. Don Hell notes that the real Galacticon always comes to his club to pick up a new john, noting that he is into bears. The real Galacticon later appears at the club, causing problems with O.S.I.'s plans.
 Haranguetan (voiced by Steven Rattazzi): A brutish supervillain with a preference for hand-to-hand violence. He is defeated by Warriana after injuring Sgt. Hatred and arguing with Brock. Later on, he returns to arch Dr. Venture again, only to become an unwitting test subject for Venture's "God Gas." The gas induces a violent hallucination in him, in which he sees Venture and Billy as demonic figures. While attacking Billy, he was confronted by The Monarch and 21 in their Blue Morpho and Kano alter-egos; 21 rescued Billy and knocked Haranguetan into a pit, killing him.
 Battleaxe (voiced by Barbara Rosenblat): Haranguetan's Irish widow and a supervillain in her own right, who owns and manages a pub. When informed by Dr. Mrs. The Monarch of her husband's death, she becomes emotional and suits up in her villain costume and makeup to retrieve his vehicle, the Haranguetank, from impound. After doing so she becomes intoxicated and begins driving to confront Dr. Venture, whom she believes to be the Blue Morpho, only to hit Think Tank and drive into the same pit where Haranguetan died. Though seemingly killed alongside Think Tank, she is later revealed to have survived and returned to running her pub.
 Copy-Cat (voiced by Toby Huss): A New York-based supervillain with the ability to produce duplicates of himself. He is smooth and womanizing, with no concern for the marital status of the objects of his interest. He attempts to seduce Dr. Mrs. The Monarch at Wide Wale's party and uses his powers along with The Monarch's stolen costume to frame him for illegally arching Dr. Venture. Despite failing in his seduction, he succeeds in increasing the rift between her and The Monarch. Though unconfirmed to be him, a similar looking man appears in All This and Gargantua-2 as the lounge singer promoted for Gargantua-2's casino. Inspired visually, as well as in speech pattern, by Dean Martin, though his voice is an impression of Frank Sinatra.
 Dr. Nidaba/Think Tank (voiced by Jeffrey Wright): A genius supervillain who works as a professor of philosophy in his civilian persona, whose class is attended by both Dean Venture and Brown Widow. Upon receiving permission to arch Dr. Venture, he swiftly deduces that Dean is distracted from his classes by his home life and advises him to try to avoid his home situation, as he does not want to lose his best student. Later, donning a purple, tank-shaped suit of armor that grants him various abilities – such as the ability to ride up walls, project barriers and shoot laser projectiles – he attacks Venture, only for his plans to play chess fail when Venture informs him he does not play the game. He fights Brock and temporarily gets the upper hand, before Warriana – who has some unspecified (but very negative) history with him – appears and helps Brock destroy his armor. He is severely injured when hit by Battleaxe in the Haranguetank shortly afterward, though he is later revealed to be alive, and in a coma in The High Cost of Loathing. His hovering tank "chair" and incredibly large head is likely a nod to the Marvel Comics supervillain MODOK. 
 The Doom Factory: An avant-garde team of supervillains based on Andy Warhol and the Warhol Superstars as well as the Legion of Doom. Their M.O. is to throw lavish parties at the homes of their arches while quietly stealing all of their possessions. Their headquarters is a flying saucer beneath the Gowanus Canal in Brooklyn. Their headquarters was blown up in midair by The Monarch after they had finished robbing Dr. Venture, killing them all at once.
Wes Warhammer (voiced by Chris McCulloch): The leader of the Doom Factory, based on Andy Warhol and Lex Luthor.
 Frigid is a reference to Factory member Brigid Berlin. She is physically patterned after, and has the freezing powers of, Captain Cold.
 Eenie-Meanie: A tiny, fairy-like villainess. Her name is a reference to Factory member Edie Sedgwick; her size-reducing powers are those of Bumblebee (a possible error in writing; Bumblebee is a heroic member of the Doom Patrol, and has never been a villain).
 Serpentine is a name reference to Factory member Ondine, and has the loquacity of Riddler.
 Hard Candy is a name reference to Factory member Candy Darling.  This particular character actually appears to be a pastiche of two characters at the same time: while his skin seems to have the angular, multi-faceted appearance of Bizarro, his face strongly looks like that of The Joker (he also constantly cracks jokes).
 She-Hemoth is a reference to Holly Woodlawn in terms of appearance, but her size-increasing power and appearance is that of Giganta.
 Gerard the Gorilla takes his moniker from Factory member Gerard Malanga; he demonstrates no super powers in the episode, he physically resembles Gorilla Grodd.
 Trashenstein is a reference to Factory member Joe Dallesandro: a pastiche of the titles of the movies for which he is most famously known, Flesh for Frankenstein and Trash. His mindless rage and monosyllabic grunting mirrors that of Solomon Grundy, even though his physical appearance is that of Frankenstein's Monster.
 Black Maria is a reference to Factory member Paul Morrissey, while his appearance is an almost exact duplicate of longtime DC Comics supervillain and Legion of Doom member Black Manta mixed with a Polaroid Polavision film camera.
 Ultra Violent is named after Factory member Ultra Violet; she physically resembles and demonstrates the powers of Star Sapphire.
 Billy Maim borrows his name from Factory member Billy Name, and while he does not seem to physically resemble any Legion of Doom member, his retractable finger claws are reminiscent of LoD mainstay Cheetah.

The Revenge Society 
A new, independent organization of villains set up primarily to oppose the Guild of Calamitous Intent; as such, a number of its members have had unpleasant dealings with the Guild in the past. Its founder is Phantom Limb, who initially created the society as his "team" to obtain the ORB for use against the Guild; however, this version of the Revenge Society was merely Phantom Limb himself along with a coffee mug named Wisdom, a toaster named Chuck, and a shoe called Lady Nightshade that he believed were real people. After escaping Guild custody later on, Phantom Limb teamed up with Richard Impossible to found the current Revenge Society, which has since had quick success in the field of villainy and they fail to kill Dr. Venture, twice in "Bright Light, Dean City". The group has effectively been broken up as of "All this and Gargantua-2".
 The Phantom Limb (Hamilton G. Fantomos) (voiced by James Urbaniak): A villain with invisible arms and legs. Although he is quite cunning and ruthless, he is also one of the more culturally refined characters in the show, judging from his interest in Persian rugs and fine cheeses. Despite his intellect, he often comes off as pretentious, and at times clueless about the repercussions of his action - as if he's too far into his 'role' to understand what he's doing. He was originally a professor at the same state college many of the show's characters had attended and had tiny deformed arms and legs, resulting in him being disowned and thus losing his "right" to inherit the title of Sovereign. When Billy Quizboy was sent in by O.S.I. to spy on him, Fantomas made Billy his lab assistant, thinking he possessed a brilliant mind. During an experiment to turn his limbs to normal size, a malfunction occurred which turned Fantomas' limbs not only to normal size, but also invisible, and endowed him with the ability to kill with a mere touch. He once dated Dr. Mrs. The Girlfriend, but she left him for The Monarch after she grew tired of his controlling and possessive personality. 
 Professor Richard Impossible (voiced by Stephen Colbert in seasons 1, 2, and "All This and Gargantua-2" Peter McCulloch in "The Terrible Secret of Turtle Bay", Christopher McCulloch in season 3, and Bill Hader in season 4): Founder of Impossible Industries, a major government contractor, and former professor to Dr. Venture, Mr. White, Billy Quizboy, and also hired Dean Venture as an intern. He holds science and the pursuit of knowledge in much higher regard than other people; at times this has made itself manifest as homicidal ruthlessness, though most of the time he's simply out of touch, causing animosity with his wife, Sally. Impossible and his cohorts are a parody of the Fantastic Four: an experiment with cosmic radiation gave them each strange abilities (this parody is referenced explicitly in the episode "Love Bheits" when it is mentioned that the Impossibles beat the Ventures in a costume contest by dressing as the Fantastic Four). Richard can stretch his body like rubber, similar to Mister Fantastic, and seems to use this power to make himself appear taller. The other members of his family have useless parodies of the other members' powers. A disheveled, depressed Richard Impossible is seen in "Pomp & Circuitry," having spent time since the party in terrible condition due to being depressed from his wife leaving him for JJ Venture, being recruited by the Phantom Limb to gain revenge on the Guild, and in the end, forming a new Guild with Phantom Limb. Richard then takes on the supervillain moniker Professor Incorrigible, but quits when he realizes his son needs him to be a father and leaves Gargantua-2 with his ex-wife and son.
 Baron Werner Ünderbheit (voiced by T. Ryder Smith): A noted member of the Guild of Calamitous Intent and former tyrant dictator of Ünderland. He wears a prosthetic metal jaw and speaks in a thick, pseudo-German accent. He blames Dr. Venture for the loss of his jaw; however, it has since been revealed that the explosion that disfigured Ünderbheit was actually caused by The Monarch. After his deposing, he is seen in "Pomp and Circuitry" panhandling outside of Impossible Industries, and again in the post-credits sequence asking to join Phantom Limb and Professor Impossible's new Guild. He is presumed dead after Gargantua-2 exploded.
Manservant (voiced by Christopher McCulloch): Baron Ünderbheit's servant, given to him as a birthday present while he was in college. He is so completely devoted to Ünderbheit that he almost seems to have no will of his own; he speaks in a zombie-like monotone and always appears to be staring into space. He is seen in "Pomp and Circuitry" with Baron Underbheit, panhandling outside of Impossible Industries, and by his side when the Baron tries joining Phantom Limb and Impossible's new Guild. In "Bright Lights, Dean City" he appears briefly with the Revenge Society in a new costume before Ünderbheit, to show loyalty to the Society, breaks his neck, killing him.
 Fat Chance (voiced by Christopher McCulloch): A supervillain recruited into the Revenge Society to fill up missing archetypical positions. After a scientific accident, Fat Chance's duodenum now contains a portal to another dimension from which he pulls objects that always seem to help him. 
 Lyndon Bee (voiced by Christopher McCulloch) and Ladyhawk Johnson (voiced by Mia Barron): A pair of supervillains inducted into the Revenge Society. During the day Lyndon Bee transforms into a bee and at night Ladyhawk transforms into a hawk, and they are cursed to never be together except during an eclipse.  
 Radical Left (voiced by Christopher McCulloch): A supervillain imprisoned at Dunwitch Asylum who has half of his body severely disfigured. Based on DC comics villain Two-Face, his personality is split between "Radical" anarchist ideas and peaceful desires more akin to a common 50's suburbanite. He is later seen as a member of the Revenge Society and later the New Council, in "All This and Gargantua-2". It is revealed in season 7 that Radical Left absorbed his nemesis Right Wing in a past encounter, meaning they each share one half of a full body. 
 Zero (Scott Hall) (voiced by Christopher McCulloch): Originally Number One in The Monarch's forces, he is brutally beaten by Brock Samson in a stealth mission on Spider-Skull Island after his adherence to cliches while sabotaging the island caught Brock's attention. Later, he takes the name Zero, and with the original Captain Sunshine, kidnaps the world's sidekicks to pit them in battle against each other, only to be stopped by a rebellion led by Gary. He joins the Revenge Society in their robbery of Gargantua-2, but his genre blindness ultimately leads to his death, as he becomes so caught up in killing Brock that he spends minutes monologuing to him and thus allows Amber Gold to disarm him, giving Brock the chance to snap his neck.

Ünderland 
Ünderland is a micronation located near Michigan. Once led by Baron Werner Ünderbheit in a dictatorship, he ruled the land and had a forced conscription for all men age 18 and a forced euthanasia at 40. Ünderland also had no prisons, as all crimes are subject to the death penalty. As a result of "Love Bheits", Ünderbheit is deposed and Ünderland becomes a democratic society.
 Girl Hitler (voiced by Mia Barron): Formerly one of Baron Ünderbheit's senior advisers, she (along with Catclops and Manic 8-ball) was "executed" for betraying Ünderbheit's confidence, although all three survived. Since Baron Ünderbheit's removal from power, she has become Ünderland's president.
 Catclops (voiced by James Urbaniak): A cyclops with a cat's face and a tail protruding from the back of his head. After their "execution" by tiger-bombs, he and Girl Hitler fled underground, where they led an ineffectual group of freedom fighters. After Ünderland's liberation, he proposed to Girl Hitler.
 Manic 8-ball (unvoiced): A human with the powers of a magic 8-ball. He was "executed" by Baron Ünderbheit for treason along with Catclops and Girl Hitler. Despite surviving the combination of tiger attack and explosion, he was captured and remained a prisoner of Ünderbheit, who used his eight-ball power for advice. Lacking a mouth, he never speaks, instead using the 8-ball messages on his chest to answer yes or no questions.
 Eunuchs (voiced by Christopher McCulloch and James Urbaniak): A pair of homosexuals who work under Baron Ünderbheit to prepare Dawn (Dean Venture) for the Baron's wedding. The thinner of the two was actually a college student from Detroit who took a semester abroad to Ünderland before being captured and conscripted as a court eunuch. He discovers that Dean is actually a boy but keeps the secret to embarrass Ünderbheit.

Imprisoned villains 
  King Gorilla (voiced by Christopher McCulloch): A talking homosexual gorilla who befriended The Monarch while in jail. King Gorilla was a member of the Guild of Calamitous Intent until his imprisonment for brutal murder and rape of Mötley Crüe lead singer Vince Neil during a reality TV show. Because of his high-profile crime, the Guild turned its back on King Gorilla and has led to the villain becoming bitter and cynical towards the Guild. After kidnapping and attempting to rape The Monarch, he was moved enough by The Monarch's quest to regain Dr. Girlfriend's love that he assisted in the fellow villain's escape from prison. Though it was believed at first that King Gorilla had been killed off screen by Phantom Limb, Christopher McCulloch's LiveJournal has revealed he was supposed to return, free from prison, in the second half of the fourth season.  
 Mr. Monday (voiced by Christopher McCulloch): An upperclass-esque villain with a monocle, obsessed with Monday. When The Monarch is planning his breakout for that night, Mr. Monday insists "Can't we wait until Monday?" and uses words such as "Mondaylicious!" Mr. Monday is released from prison by Phantom Limb, only to be hunted and killed by him on his private grounds in Showdown at Cremation Creek (Part I).  
 Tigeriffic (voiced by Paul Boocock) A former supervillain with superhuman strength and tiger-like abilities. 
 White Noise (voiced by Brendon Small) A smoking, racist former television repair-man, White Noise was transformed while repairing a TV that was still plugged into a live socket. He is concerned about The Monarch's criminal organization being "racially mixed", and doesn't want his pure white blood to be muddied. The Monarch then questions whether he even has blood, and how he knows he's even white. He speaks with a Southern dialect. During The Monarch's escape, he was supposed to aid by taking out the guards, along with Dr. Septapus. He is also hunted and fatally shot by Phantom Limb on his private grounds.
 Dr. Septapus (voiced by Christopher McCulloch): Another one of The Monarch's criminal cohorts while in prison, Dr. Septapus has seven limbs on his body. Four arms on his sides, one arm from his chest, and two legs. During The Monarch's escape, he was supposed to aid by taking out the guards, along with White Noise. He is released from prison, only to be hunted by Phantom Limb on his private grounds. He is shot down from a tree, and then shot again on the ground.
 Tiny Joseph (voiced by Doc Hammer): Although he originally appeared as one of The Monarch's henchmen in a dream sequence in "A Very Venture Christmas", he later appeared as The Monarch's cellmate. He is only a few inches tall, and inscribes a message upon a Microdot, which is to be carried out by a butterfly for The Monarch. He was also used as a projectile in The Monarch's makeshift prison dartgun.
 Teddy (voiced by Christopher McCulloch): A criminally insane supervillain with severe burns who once provided the voice for a Teddy Ruxpin-like toy, imprisoned in the Dunwitch Asylum for the Criminally Insane after hugging Ronald Reagan too hard. The boys and Hatred first use the toy to trick their father into thinking he has been kidnapped by Zeus in "Any Which Way but Zeus", and then Hank and Dermott use the same toy to trick their father into thinking he is still talking to Teddy in "Momma's Boys" by using a prepaid cellphone to keep him occupied while they sneak out of the house. When Venture discovers part of the ruse, he assumes Teddy is in danger. Hank, Dermott, Gary, and H.E.L.P.eR try to get into Dunwitch to talk to the original Teddy, but fall into Myra Brandish's coup attempt. Teddy later escapes and saves Dr. Venture and Sgt. Hatred from certain death when their car falls into a ravine on the way to "Bygolly Gulch".
 Cuckoo Clocker (voiced by Christoper McCulloch): A supervillain imprisoned at Dunwitch Asylum who has a cuckoo clock door in his head.
 Big Time: A supervillain imprisoned at Dunwitch Asylum who has a clock face tattooed on his face and his moustache resembles two clock hands. Both he and Myra Brandish believe he has powers over time.
 Maybe Man (voiced by Christopher McCulloch): A supervillain imprisoned at Dunwitch Asylum who Myra Brandish asks to place Dean in her womb so she may finally give birth to him, although he only responds with "maybe".

Fraternity of Torment 
The Fraternity of Torment is one of a handful of supervillain organizations other than the Guild of Calamitous Intent. The group was largely made up of disenfranchised men shunned by society for their various physical defects. They were frequently the antagonists to Team Venture during the 1960s, and it is shown that Jonas and his team often seemed to merely be tormenting and bullying them for fun rather than fighting them out of any sense of justice. The remnants of the original group appear in "Now Museum, Now You Don't", but it is stated they still have some level of presence in the world of organized supervillainy alongside the "Peril Partnership".
 Scaramantula (voiced by Toby Huss): An Italian spider-themed supervillain themed after the James Bond villain Scaramanga. He has eight fingers on his right hand and a partial spider mask on his face complemented by his eyebrows and moustache as a full set of eight legs. He owned Spider Skull Island until an unsuccessful kidnapping of Rusty Venture results in their defeat by Team Venture, as Dr. Venture has infiltrated the group posing as "Dr. Fanadragon" whose backstory claimed a supernumerary nipple caused exclusion in his hometown. After Dr. Venture reveals his identity, the Fraternity is defeated by Team Venture and Scaramantula escaped, and set off a self-destruct sequence that ultimately failed, resulting in Spider Skull Island's annexation into Venture Industries. In the present day, Scaramantula has retired from supervillainy and is in top shape having exercised on Spider Skull Island's escape path many times. After seeing what has been done to his former home, he assists Brainulo in taking revenge, and ultimately escapes another death at the hands of the self-destruct sequence.
 Brainulo (voiced by Christopher McCulloch): A supervillain from a thousand years in the future claimed to have been trapped in the year 1969 after Dr. Jonas Venture destroyed his means of returning. With his superior intellect and mental powers, he controlled a giant robot known as Futuro. During the attack on Spider Skull Island, Brainulo took control of Futuro, but the Humongoloid knocks it over, crushing Brainulo. In the present day, Brainulo is revealed to be a paraplegic and it appears he has become senile, but the senility is all an act to take revenge on Dr. Venture and his offspring. He preys on the insecurities and fears of those at the Jonas Venture Museum's opening party, hoping to cause a riot, but when he fails he attempts to take control of Futuro one last time, but the attempt shorts his own brain, resulting in actual senility. He turns up again in the lobby of Impossible Industries in "Bright Lights, Dean City" as an apparent applicant to the Revenge Society; however, given that he is merely sitting still and staring, he may have simply wandered in.
 Manotaur: A supervillain possessing superstrength and having been made an outcast due to his size. During the flashback in "Shadowman 9: In the Cradle of Destiny", The Monarch claimed to be "Manotaur" to avoid retaliation from Phantom Limb after he seduced Dr. Girlfriend. In the end of the episode, it is revealed the Manotaur is real and had since retired into a job with the MTA whereupon he is killed by the still living Phantom Limb.

Peril Partnership 
The Peril Partnership is another supervillain union based out of Toronto. It is one of several rival organizations to the Guild of Calamitous Intent. Its members can be distinguished by their wearing the letters 'PP.' In season 7, it is revealed that the Peril Partnership has infiltrated the Guild. However, it is revealed that this is actually a splinter group made up of some of the Peril Partnership's American members, hoping to cause a war between the Guild and Peril Partnership so that they can take over as the dominant super villain organization.
 Tiger Shark (voiced by Christopher McCulloch): A shark-themed supervillain who is the only known member of the Peril Partnership. He appears in "Any Which Way But Zeus" to participate in the think tank to find everyone's kidnapped henchmen and sidekicks. He reveals he previously fought Brock Samson during Samson's time in O.S.I., though his vendetta is more personal since he found Brock in bed with his wife. Brock half-heartedly apologizes and hints his wife lied to him about being married.
The Creep (voiced by James Adomian): The leader of the Peril Partnership splinter cell. The Creep was originally an O.S.I agent known as Mission Creep, but was discharged after he wiped out an entire Boy Scout troop while securing a mountain fortress, claiming that he mistook them for enemy combatants. He refused to join the Guild due to their rules and by-laws, and instead joined the Peril Partnership, only to again find himself chafed by their code of conduct. Finally, he established a splinter cell of equally disgruntled villains, planning to provoke a war between the Guild and the Partnership. He then made a habit of killing Guild villains for sport and taking their signature tools or gimmicks as prizes, as he planned to weaponize them against the O.S.I after taking out both the Guild and the Partnership. He is tracked down by the Monarch and 21 on orders from the Guild and O.S.I, and he forces them to play a deadly game of Lawn Darts, ending when he accidentally kills himself while distracted by Dr. Venture and Billy Quizboy appearing from Grover Cleveland's Presidential time machine.
Blind Rage (voiced by Brendon Small): A blind, pro wrestling-themed villain who is part of the Peril Partnership splinter cell. He is sent to blackmail the Council of Thirteen, but is rebuked. Later the same day he is hunted down by Red Death, who knocks him out and ties him to the subway train tracks (but not telling him if the train is on the track he is tied to), leaving him to either be run over or survive and deliver a message not to threaten the Guild. Whether or not he survived is unknown.

S.P.H.I.N.X. 
Originally a terrorist organization that was the primary adversary of the O.S.I. 20 years ago until its defeat in the Pyramid Wars of 1987. The Pyramid Wars began when S.P.H.I.N.X. seemingly claimed credit for the Movie Night Massacre on Gargantua-1, in which Jonas Venture Sr. and many others perished, but the organization was actually framed by the Sovereign using S.P.H.I.N.X. Commander's form. Several members of the O.S.I. who were disillusioned with its ineffectual bureaucracy decided take up the S.P.H.I.N.X. mantle, along with their leftover equipment, to create an organization to deal with rogue supervillains. At the end of season 4 and the beginning of season 5, the members of S.P.H.I.N.X. who were formerly O.S.I. agents are redrafted into O.S.I., leaving the former Henchman 21 as the only S.P.H.I.N.X. operative. Gary tries to recruit new members, and accidentally reunites the original S.P.H.I.N.X. members.  Knowing that their S.P.H.I.N.X. loyalty chips will soon dissolve and kill them, they dedicate themselves to a final suicide attack against the O.S.I.  S.P.H.I.N.X.'s rented headquarters space within the Venture compound is blown up in the season 5 episode "S.P.H.I.N.X. Rising", forcing Gary to live in the Venture's backyard. The original remaining S.P.H.I.N.X. members are:

 Michael/SPHINX Commander (voiced by Christopher McCulloch): A fairly tall man who can't control the volume of his voice. He has been stalking his former lover Theresa, the Countess. Gary forbids him to use his former name "SPHINX Commander" because Gary is now the leader, so Michael calls himself "Mister Daddy Warlord of the Children of the Corn". He later usurps Gary's position and kidnaps Hank, who is using the Countess' old power suit.  He is later killed by Brock after refusing to hand over Hank.
 Theresa/The Countess: SPHINX Commander's former second-in-command and lover, a parody of the Baroness. Her powered armor suit grants its wearer enhanced strength and mobility.  Hank adopts the suit, but since it was designed for the Countess it makes Hank look and move like a woman. It has a feature that prevents the wearer from harming the SPHINX Commander. After SPHINX is defeated, Hank keeps the power suit and wears it all the time. Molotov Cocktease steals the suit in "O.S.I. Love You", and it is destroyed by Brock Samson in order to fake Molotov's death.
 Wind Song (voiced by Tim Meadows): A parody of Storm Shadow,  Wind Song is an African American ninja member of the original S.P.H.I.N.X.  He has taken to forming a family and wearing Coogi sweaters inspired by Cliff Huxtable during his retirement.
 Diamond Backdraft (voiced by Larry Murphy): A former member of S.P.H.I.N.X. who was the group's flamethrower and snake-handling operative.

Other supervillains 
 Storm Front (voiced by Christopher McCulloch): A weather controlling supervillain who protests to having to have his powers temporarily taken away for the think tank in "Any Which Way But Zeus". He claims he will not harm anyone, as his powers are purely precipitation based.
 Crime-o-dile: A crocodile-themed supervillain previously killed by Captain Sunshine after he fell into his own crock-pit that was set on fire. A henchman appears in a support group attended by 21 and 24 after the imprisonment of The Monarch.
 Scorpio (voiced by Christopher McCulloch): Another member of Captain Sunshine's rogues gallery who is scorpion-themed. He later appears in Sgt. Hatred's old home in Malice, having become Princess Tinyfeet's new lover.

Recurring and minor characters 
 Molotov Cocktease (voiced by Mia Barron): A highly trained assassin and sometime-ally, sometime-rival to Brock Samson, as well as his love interest until her apparent death in "Operation P.R.O.M."  They first met when she was a gymnast at the inaugural Goodwill Games and her father was a mercenary they had been sent to kill before he assassinated Mikhail Gorbachev, but he discovers she too was a mercenary who killed Brock's partner at the time. She unfailingly wore a chastity belt until the end of the fourth season, when she told Brock she was "taken" by Monstroso. She appears to commit suicide at the end of season four, by falling off a tall cliff in front of Brock Samson. However, in the fifth-season premiere, Brock investigates the site and finds evidence that Molotov may have faked her death and is in hiding with Monstroso. She and Monstroso are captured by O.S.I. in "O.S.I. Love You", but she escapes custody and goes on a rampage throughout O.S.I.'s hovering headquarters, killing several operatives and stealing Hank's power suit. In the end, just as Brock is about to kill her, Col. Gathers reveals she has been hired by him to root out double agents in O.S.I. and to test their security. To prevent this knowledge from falling into the hands of the Misters, they fake Molotov's death. Her status and whereabouts since then are unknown.
 Colonel Bud Manstrong (voiced by Terrence Fleming): The former leader of the crew of Gargantua-1. Manstrong takes a strong moral stance on most issues, and is strictly sexually abstinent, which his mother attributes to his father having been a larger influence on Bud than her. He also has the moral stances and vocabulary of a man from the 1950s to the 1960s. Although he is very willful in most situations, he wilts under attention from his often inebriated and oversexed mother. His forbearance of sex puts a great deal of strain on his relationship with cosmonaut Lieutenant Anna Baldavich, his love interest and fellow crew member aboard Gargantua-1. He is declared a hero when Gargantua-1 crashes on a wanted terrorist group in "Guess Who's Coming to State Dinner?" whereupon he is offered a chance to run for the vice-presidency, which he turns down in horror upon learning of the president's sexual indiscretions.
 Lieutenant Anna Baldavich (voiced by Nina Hellman): Col. Manstrong's only companion on Gargantua-1. Baldavich is a Russian cosmonaut whose face is never shown, but it is suggested that it is extremely unattractive. However, this has not stopped Manstrong from falling in love with her, and she for him, but he will not return her advances for intimacy, which has caused Baldavich to become increasingly upset with him. To this end, she successfully seduces Brock, who demands that during sex she keep her helmet on, in order to both satisfy her urges and to make Bud jealous enough to force him to initiate sex with her. Instead, Bud completely gives up on his relationship with Anna, and pushes Brock to marry her due to his archaic beliefs. Manstrong reveals that her father invented the Mr. Mouth board game, and as a result she is quite wealthy. After the Ventures leave Gargantua-1, she and Manstrong seem to reconcile, but he still refuses to be intimate. As the space station fails for the last time and crashes into the Earth, Baldavich gives Manstrong a handjob, causing him to pass out, and she dies in the resultant crash.
 The Master (voiced by H. Jon Benjamin): A shapeshifting, supernatural presence who lives in a black void and is Dr. Orpheus's mentor. He is much more relaxed than Orpheus, and often chides his student for being extremely uptight. However, this attitude seems to be his method of imparting advice to his pupil; he convinces Orpheus to better himself by pointing out his flaws. He has called Orpheus his best student and seems to have a fondness for him, frequently letting Orpheus come to him for advice. 
 Myra Brandish (voiced by Joanna Adler): A mentally unstable woman who is under the impression that she is Hank and Dean's mother, kidnapping the boys and eventually capturing Dr. Venture when she comes in contact with him as well, revealing that she is also his former O.S.I. bodyguard. After being subdued by Brock, he states that Myra is a former cast member of American Gladiators nicknamed "Power Cat" who checked herself into an insane asylum after the show was cancelled and began kidnapping the Ventures whenever she goes off her medication and breaks out. Venture, however, admits that he slept with her. During a flashback in "Shadowman 9: In the Cradle of Destiny", she is seen acting as Dr. Venture's bodyguard, saving him from an attack by The Monarch with loving eyes towards Venture. In a later flashback in "The Invisible Hand of Fate", Myra is seen being taken away by O.S.I., claiming she loves Dr. Venture, while he holds his toddler sons in his arms. It is in this episode that she is revealed to be working on Operation: Rusty's Blanket, an assignment that Brock receives later. Myra's next appearance is in "Momma's Boys", where it is revealed she is incarcerated at the Dunwitch Asylum for the Criminally Insane and has been keeping in contact with Dean who believes she is his mother. She has charmed one of the guards and several other inmates under her thrall as "Momma" and has had Dean visit on Mother's Day so she may finally give birth to him, revealing to both Dean and Hank that she is not their biological mother. Hank's declaration causes the other inmates to rebel, allowing for their escape. Elsewhere, Dr. Venture has confided to Sgt. Hatred that he tricked Myra into thinking she was the boys' mother in order to get her to babysit them for free.
 General Manhowers (voiced by Christopher McCulloch): A general in the United States armed forces. Due to his high military rank, he is one of Dr. Venture's principal clients. He buys the Ooo Ray from Venture in the pilot episode. In later appearances, Gen. Manhowers realizes that Venture has not invented anything new in years, as in his latest foray to the compound during season 3's "The Doctor Is Sin". However, he does commission Venture to make an army of Venturesteins out of the murdered Ted and Sonny as well as some spoiled clones of the boys. When the original Venturestein revolts during season 5's "Venture Libre", he sends Venture to retrieve him, with a jPad armed to explode.
 Princess Tinyfeet (voiced by Sue Gilad): Sgt. Hatred's wife, she is a Native American whom Sgt. Hatred loves for her namesake tiny feet. She divorces Sgt. Hatred in "The Family That Slays Together, Stays Together".
 Dr. Tara Quymn (voiced by Nina Hellman): A superscientist and childhood friend of Dr. Rusty Venture, as her mother Mz. Quymn was well acquainted with Dr. Jonas Venture, and her stepfather is Colonel Gentleman. She meets up with Rusty when he goes to the Amazon to seek out a plant that might help with his erectile dysfunction while she is in the Amazon for more altruistic reasons, investigating as to whether or not the fruit known as Solomon's Heart can cure cancer. Her life closely parallels that of Dr. Venture, in that she is accompanied by a brutish bodyguard and has a set of twin children, although they are all women unlike Dr. Venture's all-male family unit. She and Rusty fall for each other, once more, but the alleged attack of the "Wereodile" exacerbates Dr. Quymn's epilepsy causing a seizure, a fact that horrifies Dr. Venture, and she begins to smoke a cigarette she has hidden away in a pendant around her neck. She has had a series of bad relationships, and Ginnie believes that this is just another. In the end, the two doctors end their respective relationships, but it is later revealed that Dr. Quymn's heart was broken by the short affair when Colonel Gentleman berates Rusty for hurting his stepdaughter, unaware of the true circumstances behind their breakup. It is suggested that Dr. Quymn is the half-sister of Dr. Venture, as the two closely resemble each other and Dr. Jonas Venture Sr. and Mz. Quymn were long involved in a romantic affair behind Colonel Gentleman's back.
Nancy & Drew Quymn (voiced by Nina Hellman and Joanna Adler): Dr. Quymn's identical twin daughters, who only differ in that Drew has a freckle on her nose. They go on mystery solving adventures, not unlike those of Hank and Dean. Hank falls in love with both of them, but both are instead enamoured with Dean who is oblivious to their attraction. They fight over who should have Dean, but they later decide to share him, but he is repulsed by the event as he believes the two to be "wereodiles". When Hank is revealed to have been circumcised by the Amazonian villagers threatened by the "Wereodile", the two suddenly lose interest in Dean. Hank later tries to ask them out for his and Dean's prom, to no avail. Their name comes from the fictional girl detective Nancy Drew.
 Ginnie (voiced by Joanna Adler): Dr. Quymn's muscular bodyguard. Her sexuality is a source of jokes, as she resembles the butch lesbian archetype and constantly tries to convince Dr. Quymn to give up men. However, she still flirts with Brock, who is confused by her means of courtship which includes the use of double-entendres and sexual poses before rebuffing him when he pays attention to her. In the end, Ginnie reveals in her discussion to Dr. Quymn that she does not want to have to pick her back up from another broken relationship, showing that Quymn has been in a series of broken relationships. In the confusion, Dr. Venture asks for help and Brock comes to his assistance, resulting in an equally matched fight between Brock and Ginnie, who both show pleasure in the fight.
 Venturestein (voiced by Christopher McCulloch): A former henchman of The Monarch killed by Brock and brought back to life by Dr. Venture's superscience in "¡Viva los Muertos!". Due to his initial attempt to strangle Dr. Venture, Brock caves in his skull and they have to find a replacement belonging to a deceased black man. His control over the English language is limited, at first, but he soon begins to learn how to compose more coherent sentences. Dr. Venture initially decides his Venturestein project should work in factories, using the boys' learning beds to teach Venturestein how to make shoes, but General Manhowers decides to buy 100 Venturesteins when he discovers they can be used as expendable soldiers, and filled with C-4. In "Venture Libre", it is revealed that during his time in the army, he and the Venturesteins are sent to quell a factory strike in Puerta Bahia, only for Venturestein to meet Jorge, the young Mexican boy who appeared in the instructional video he watched when he was first made, who teaches him how to speak better and also the teachings of Che Guevara. This leads Venturestein to liberate several other scientific experiments he has found in the Central American jungle, for some reason home to many evil scientists, and to form an "Abomi-Nation" where all such scientific experiments can call home. His loyalty to Dr. Venture, who he does not see as a horrible creator as the other scientific experiments do, and his friendship with Hank, as well as the death of Congresswoman Marsha Backwood, lead to the successful formation of his "Abomi-Nation" and their formal entry into the United Nations. Venturestein is still seen as being able to properly make sneakers in his appearance.
 Groovy Gang: A parody of the cast of Scooby-Doo and several infamous criminals who head to the Venture Compound to steal items for gas money.
Ted (voiced by Christopher McCulloch): The gang's charismatic and sociopathic leader, who often threatens the others with violence and the wrath of God. Upon spotting Dr. Byron Orpheus, he believes the Venture Compound to be a "Dracula factory". Ted is killed by Brock when he attempts to kill the man in self-defense, and he is used to make a new Venturestein, later seen to be one under the original Venturestein's command. He is a pastiche of Fred Jones and serial killer Ted Bundy.
 Patty (voiced by Sue Gilad): The red-headed and relatively fashion-conscious member of the gang. It is hinted that Ted kidnapped her years ago, and she is now suffering from Stockholm syndrome. She runs away from the compound with Val after Ted, Sonny, and Groovy are killed. She is a pastiche of Daphne Blake and Patty Hearst, an heiress who was kidnapped by the Symbionese Liberation Army and then joined them in a series of crimes, during which time it is believed she suffered from Stockholm syndrome.
 Val (voiced by Joanna Adler): The bespectacled brains of the group, who seems to be attracted to Patty and is aware of Ted's lies, but does nothing about them as they allow her to both take advantage of Patty's low self-esteem and abuse Sonny when he is at his most vulnerable. Despite her outspoken misandric belief system, she gets along with Ted quite well due to their shared desire for control over Patty and Sonny. She survives the events of the episode with Patty and runs away to parts unknown afterwards. She is a pastiche of Velma Dinkley and Valerie Solanas, radical feminist who penned the SCUM Manifesto, which Val quotes, and attempted to assassinate Andy Warhol.
 Sonny (voiced by Paul Boocock): The paranoid hippie dog-owner of the group who is regularly tormented by Ted and Val. Ted has him addicted to an anti-psychotic medication he calls "Groovy Treats", as the medication is used to keep Sonny from hearing the voice of his dog Groovy. At some point in the past, Sonny and Groovy accidentally came across the Venture brothers, and in a paranoid psychotic rage killed the two. His and Ted's discovery of the boys alive and well lead the group to investigate further. Sonny is killed by Brock using Ted's gun, and is later turned into a new Venturestein under the original's command. He is a pastiche of Shaggy Rogers and David Berkowitz, the infamous "Son of Sam" serial killer who said he was coerced into his murders by a demon who spoke to him through a neighbor's dog.
 Groovy (voiced by Christopher McCulloch): The gang's Great Dane who only seems to talk to Sonny in a German accent to push him into committing murder at the behest of "the Master", though Sonny had largely been able to resist him. No one else in the gang is ever spoken to by Groovy, so it is not clear if he can actually talk, as the Master is another character on The Venture Bros., or if the speech is a schizophrenic hallucination held by Sonny. At some point in the past, Sonny and Groovy found the Venture brothers and while Sonny bludgeoned one of them to death, Groovy fatally mauled the other. Groovy has his throat crushed by Venturestein and then turned into a shoe.  
 The Outrider (voiced by Doc Hammer): Dr. Orpheus's former protege who successfully seduced Orpheus's wife and ended their marriage. Rather than focusing his attention on learning the ins and outs of necromancy, the Outrider spent his time looking at the easier shortcuts to achieve greater power, which included trepanning to insert an amulet known as the Eye of Osiris into his skull to provide him safe passage into and out of the Second World. He appears in "The Better Man", saving the Order of the Triad from an elder god Torrid summons from the Second World, but he later becomes trapped between worlds when attacked by Torrid once more. In their attempts to save him, the Order of the Triad removes the Eye of Osiris from his skull, trapping them in the Second World until Jefferson Twilight develops his latent magical abilities. The Outrider later admits he idolized Orpheus but disliked how he attained his goals in life and found the easier way out, so that he would be able to be a family man. He and Tatyana teach Triana magic, and at Orpheus's Halloween party uses a puzzle box similar to the one from Hellraiser as part of their magical production that evening.
 Tatyana: Dr. Orpheus's ex-wife and mother of Triana. When the Master uses her form to speak to Orpheus, he is entranced by its beauty and finds it difficult to teach Orpheus any sort of lesson, noting how buxom she is. It is only during this time that she speaks, but with the Master's voice. Tatyana bears a striking resemblance to Cassandra Peterson's horror hostess persona Elvira, Mistress of the Dark.
 Brown Widow (voiced by Nathan Fillion): A superhero based in New York City who has the ability to spin webbing from his lower spine. He first appears in "Bright Lights, Dean City," in which he saves Dr. Venture using his powers when a taxi driven by Baron Underbheit goes out of control. He later appears to befriend Dean, revealing that he gained his powers in a laboratory accident involving spiders, though he quickly becomes more interested in singing a musical number with Dr. Venture. He later reappears in the sixth season as a college student and classmate of Dean, who does not seem to realize who he is. He is bullied by other students, who throw garbage at him to make him reflexively use his powers, which they believe is him soiling himself. In the past, he dated Sirena Ong, and he has a job at a ninja-themed restaurant. 
 The Blue Morpho (voiced by Paul F. Tompkins):  The Monarch's late father who was killed in a plane crash decades ago.  His real name was Don Fitzcarraldo. He was initially presented as a socialite and good friend of Jonas Venture Sr., and later was revealed to have been a vigilante superhero affiliated with the original Team Venture. Kano was originally his bodyguard and crimefighting partner. He appeared on the Rusty Venture television show and had a comic book by Jack Kirby detailing his adventures published. However, much like Jonas, he had much poorer morals in private compared to his public persona; he engaged in such behaviors as cheating on his wife with celebrities, and didn't care if he was labeled a "bad guy" by the public. This embracing of the darker sides of his personality inspired his son to adopt the Blue Morpho mantle as his own, using the persona to eliminate rival supervillains for the right to arch Dr. Venture. He is eventually revealed to have been the Venture Industries hatchetman, eliminating any enemies Jonas might have had. In season 7 it is revealed he was resurrected by Jonas as the cyborg Venturion, who strangled young Rusty Venture and that led to Kano snapping his neck, killing him again. He is later found by Dr. Z who reconstructed him, which allowed him to become the former Councilman #1, Vendata. After regaining his memory, Venturion interfaces with Dr Jonas' and it is revealed that Jonas' blackmailed the Morpho by using a recording of Jonas, Morpho, Jill St. John and Stella Stevens in an orgy. The Morpho was very upset at this indiscretion because he and his wife have been trying for a child. Jonas agrees to "examine" his wife, claiming his science is very "potent." Venturion (regaining his human memory) calls Jonas out on this, but in true narcissist fashion Jonas shrugs it off. Regardless of Malcom's (The Monarch) biological father, The Morpho loved Malcom dearly, an emotion Jonas never authentically showed to his legitimate son Rusty. While Venturion is distracted recalling all the flashbacks, Jonas attempts to coerce Billy into switching their brains. Billy refuses to kill Venturion and The Monarch appears in Monarch fashion. Venturion sees him and joyfully mutters the name "Malcom," but before The Monarch can get any answers Jonas attacks him and through a series of event leads to the death of both. OSI later claims Jonas' head for "experiments." 
 Sirena Ong: (voiced by Cristin Milioti) The daughter of Wide Wale and budding love interest of Hank. Because of her father's mutation, she has inherited a number of whale-related physical traits, such as the need to regularly have her body in water and the ability to breathe underwater. She is blunt and temperamental, and although she understands her father's overbearing love for her, she is easily irritated by his henchmen when they try to keep her under control; she bears a particular dislike for one henchman named Rocco. She once dated Brown Widow prior to dating Hank, but broke up with him. Hank's good-natured efforts to impress her with the aid of Billy, Pete and Dean lead her to further develop deeper feelings for him because of how genuine he is. In Season 7, she and Hank are a couple now but she has to face her father's overprotectiveness and his lack approval in Hank. She also meets her uncle Douglas and is angry her father never told her about him. It is revealed in the mid-finale, she has cheated on Hank by sleeping with his brother Dean.

The Impossibles 
 Sally Impossible (voiced by Mia Barron): Richard's estranged wife. She has invisible skin which leaves her muscle tissue visible and requires all her concentration to keep her skin visible. Sally developed, and still maintains, a crush on Dr. Venture, who was repelled when he discovered her condition. Richard has implied that she has been repeatedly unfaithful and that her newborn son might have been fathered by someone else. This is a reference to the Invisible Woman's relationship with the Sub-Mariner, who has pursued her romantically from their first encounter. Eventually, it came to the point where Richard was keeping Sally practically as a prisoner in their home and keeping her under constant guard, accurately suspecting that she wanted to run away from him. Sally has been dating Jonas Venture Jr. and resides on Spider Skull Island with the rest of the Impossibles, sans Richard and Cody, though it is hinted that she and JJ are having troubles due to the latter's inability to commit. In "All this and Gargantua-2", however, her and JJ's strained relationship finally breaks and she decides to leave with Rocket and Richard, though she implies that she and Richard's relationship will be one of shared custody over Rocket rather than anything romantic or loving.
 Rocket Impossible: Sally and Richard's newborn son. Thus far, he has not displayed any sort of superpowers or genetic mutations.
 Ned (voiced by Christopher McCulloch): Sally and Cody's mentally handicapped cousin, who has been transformed into a "giant callus" with  skin. He lived with Sally, Rocket and J.J. on Spider-Skull Island for some time, but his whereabouts during the events of Gargantua-2 were unknown. He was later seen attending J.J.'s funeral with the rest of his family.
 Cody (voiced by Christopher McCulloch): Sally's brother. Bursts into flames when exposed to oxygen. He cannot control this painful reaction, so he is kept in an air-tight container. As a result, he is usually in a state of unconsciousness. In "Bright Lights, Dean City", Professor Impossible is revealed to have been using an imprisoned Cody to provide clean energy to Impossible Industries, an act which Phantom Limb describes as being "the most deliciously evil thing [he'd] ever seen", though the true evilness of it seems to be lost on Professor Impossible. His fate after being freed from Impossible Industries is unknown.

Jonny Quest characters
 Action Johnny/Jonny Quest (voiced by Brendon Small): Since the death of Dr. Benton Quest, he has been secreted away within the Quest Bathysphere, living in isolation and feeding (when possible) his addiction to narcotics, as shown in the episode "Twenty Years to Midnight". He is fooled into handing over a piece of Dr. Venture Sr.'s machinery after being bribed by the Captain and Jonas Jr., an act that Jonas Jr. later regretted. He has sobered up, but is still a high strung nervous wreck due to his many psychological issues resulting from his father's irresponsible parenting. In "The Buddy System", Johnny claims that "fathers are caring and protective men, and I don't have one of those". In the same episode, Johnny also expresses the desire to free Dean from his father but is stopped mid-sentence by Brock. He also implies that he staged several crimes to spite his father, including the murder of their dog Bandit. He has since shown to become much better in "Self Medication" as well as more functional and social, off-handedly mentioning that he had gone on a date with Velma Dinkley which resulted in him contracting herpes. In "The Terminus Mandate" it is revealed that he is living in a rehab facility, and he finally is able to make peace with Dr. Z.
 Race Bannon (voiced by Christopher McCulloch): Brock's friend from the Office of Secret Intelligence, where he once worked as a torturer. Died after jumping from a jet that Nat King Cobra's Snake Men were piloting while retrieving the Goliath Serum. He carries various spy gadgets reminiscent of those carried by James Bond.
 Hadji Singh (voiced by Jackson Publick): Another reference to a Jonny Quest character, he is now a manager working with Jonas Jr. He is seen also taking care of Johnny, while worrying that if he brings Johnny back home, his (Hadji's) wife will leave him.
 Dr. Z (voiced by Christopher McCulloch): A reference to a recurring villain "Dr. Zin" in the Jonny Quest franchise, he was featured in the episode "The Buddy System" in which he was to be a special guest star in a stage show featuring Action Johnny. The show was being performed as part of "Rusty's Day Camp for Boy Adventurers." Upon seeing his old nemesis, Johnny panics and has a mental breakdown. Sergeant Hatred, having interrupted the show with what he thought was a routine arching, greets Z with a hand shake, saying "The Dr. Z! Aw man, I love your work." In "Self-Medication" Dr. Z was confronted by Action Johnny, Dr. Venture, and a group of former "Boy Adventurers" to accuse him of the murder of their therapist. However, Dr. Z was innocent and the group discover that he is married. During a peaceful dinner Dr. Z advises the former "Boy Adventurers" that they need to grow up and stop living in the past, revealing that he feels that he had wasted his life and wished he and his wife could have had a normal marriage. In "Pomp and Circuitry", one of the silhouetted members of the Council of 13 looks and sounds a lot like Dr. Z. Appears to be a homage to Fu Manchu, an evil genius from a series of novels by English author Sax Rohmer. In "What Color is Your Cleansuit?" Dr. Z appears in an old Guild PSA to warn against the dangers of blundering henchmen. In "Bot Seeks Bot", Dr. Z is confirmed to be a member of the Council of 13. He is a member of the new Council of 13 in season 6, having survived the Sovereign's purge of the old Council.
 Mrs. Z (voiced by Seth Green): Dr. Z's wife of many years after he retires from supervillainy. She says that she was in fact Dr. Z's beard until the two fell in love, although it was much too late to form a family.

Therapy group members 
 Lance (voiced by Seth Green) and Dale Hale (voiced by John Hodgman): The Hale Brothers were previously famous boy detectives until the murder of their father, the reason for their therapy, particularly Dale who cannot get over the sight of seeing their father dead. It is hinted that they are the perpetrators, as Lance continually dismisses that their fingerprints were on the gun that was used to murder their father due to their sleuthing, and later, when Dr. Venture accuses them of doing so, Lance quips that it was never proven and Dale goes into hysterics believing that Dr. Venture knows the truth. It is implied that the murder was driven by Lance's desire to get at their inheritance, only to discover that their father's money would all go to the Boy Detective Academy, leaving them with nothing but a car to show for their crime, though they both cherish the vehicle. They are parodies of the Hardy Boys and The Menendez Brothers.
 Ro-Boy Z (voiced by Christopher McCulloch): A robotic boy who has abandonment issues due to his creator/father and psychopathic tendencies due to a life of fighting giant robots. He also has anger issues when he sees other robots, leading to apparent pyromaniacal tendencies. He eventually gets adopted by Dr. Z and his wife Mrs. Z, allowing the couple to fulfill their familial desires and giving Ro-Boy a way to move on from his creator.

The Super Gang 

 Chuck Scarsdale/Captain Sunshine (voiced by Kevin Conroy): A sunlight-powered superhero previously mentioned by The Monarch in reference to having his henchmen return the charred remains of Wonder Boy to him. Captain Sunshine, appearing in person in the episode "Handsome Ransom", has since sworn revenge on The Monarch and thwarts his plans to get a ransom for Hank and Dean from Dr. Venture when he takes Hank away, inducting him as his new sidekick and ward Wonder Boy. It is hinted that Captain Sunshine has pederastic tendencies towards the various boys he takes as his ward and Wonder Boy, although Jackson Publick has confirmed that this is not the case. In actuality, the various dangerous situations Scarsdale had to face as the original Wonderboy resulted in him developing an apparent case of Peter Pan syndrome, living out the childhood he never had through his colorful toy-filled mansion and living vicariously through his wards. Coupled with his guilt over the death of the 3rd Wonder Boy and his apparent habit of literally throwing criminals into prison rather than handing them over to the authorities, Scarsdale is painted as a dangerously out-of-touch man in the vein of older superheroes. He is the lead anchor of the Action 5 News Team, but leaves his post at the evening broadcast when The Monarch tries to re-kidnap Hank, despite being powerless at night. In the ensuing conflict, Captain Sunshine is exposed to a device Dr. Mrs. The Monarch created to reproduce his sun powers, intended to be his one weakness. Instead, the device repowers him and he rallies to defeat The Monarch and his minions, only to be disappointed when Hank chooses to step down as Wonder Boy and return home. In "Any Which Way But Zeus", Red Mantle claims he was not Captain Sunshine's archenemy, but the original Captain Sunshine (Desmond), identifying Scarsdale as the original Wonder Boy. In "Bot Seeks Bot", Sunshine and his new Wonderboy attend the funeral of his archenemy Boggles the Clue Clown and has an emotional outburst over the death of his long-time archenemy.
Desmond (voiced by Doc Hammer): Captain Sunshine's butler. In "Any Which Way But Zeus", Desmond is revealed to be the original Captain Sunshine, and Scarsdale his ward Wonder Boy. Desmond also acts as Zeus to convince the various organizations to set up a series of protective laws and such for sidekicks.
 Wonderboy (voiced by Patton Oswalt): This former Wonderboy was the first ward of Captain Sunshine. As a result of his depression from being kicked out and his failed career as an independent hero, he has turned to binge eating and joins a support group of fellow former boy adventurers for therapy. It is assumed that he is the second Wonderboy, succeeding Scarsdale to Desmond, and preceding the one killed by The Monarch, Hank, and a fifth one who appears in season 5's "Bot Seeks Bot".
 Wonderboy 5 (voiced by Larry Murphy): Captain Sunshine's current Wonderboy, who seems more or less indifferent to the death of Boggles the Clue Clown and has to drag Captain Sunshine away when he has an emotional outburst as Boggles' coffin is lowered into his grave. He also shows himself to be a more competent detective than his mentor, almost immediately solving Clue Clown's final riddle when Captain Sunshine was utterly stumped.
 Barbara Qantas/Barbie-Q (voiced by Rachel Feinstein): Chuck Scarsdale's Australian co-anchor who resembles a Barbie doll that can spout pink flames. She is one of Zeus's captives in "Any Which Way But Zeus".
 Sam Turgen/U.S. Steel (voiced by Doc Hammer): The Action 5 News Team's sports anchor who as U.S. Steel is a superpowered and Uncle Sam-inspired hero. In "Any Which Way But Zeus", U.S. Steel expects to find Ghost Robot, unaware he was killed earlier.
 Neville Brown/Brown Thrasher: Sam Turgen's sports co-anchor who as Brown Thrasher has bird-themed powers akin to Falcon. He is one of Zeus's captives in "Any Which Way But Zeus".
 Weatherbot 5/Ghost Robot (voiced by Christopher McCulloch): The Action 5 News Team's meteorologist whose true identity is that of a robot with a ghost inside of him. It is assumed he is killed by 21 in "Any Which Way But Zeus" when 21 shatters his robotic eyes. However, in season 5's "Bot Seeks Bot", Ghost Robot is alive and well, and he is deputized by the O.S.I. to aid in their undercover mission to discover the identities of the Council of Thirteen, by going on a date with Vendata as robotic Guild member Galacticon. Ghost Robot's interest in having fingers and the appearance of the real Galacticon jeopardize the mission, resulting in the death of Vendata.

References

Lists of characters in American television adult animation
Lists of animated science fiction television characters
Characters